= Silda =

Silda may refer to:

== Places ==
- Silda (Sogn og Fjordane), an island in Vågsøy municipality, Sogn og Fjordane county, Norway
- Silda (Finnmark), an uninhabited island in Loppa municipality, Finnmark county, Norway
- Silda, West Bengal, a village in West Bengal, India

== People ==
- Silda Wall Spitzer, the founder and chair of the board of Children for Children and former first lady of New York state

== Other ==
- Silda (moth), a synonym of the genus Eublemma of the family Erebidae
- Silda camp attack, a 2010 attack in Silda, West Bengal, India
- Battle of Silda, an 1810 naval battle between the United Kingdom and the Kingdom of Denmark-Norway
- Sildajazz, an annual jazz festival in Haugesund, Norway
