= Banstala railway station =

Railway Station in West Bengal

General information
- Location: Dherua-Midnapore Road, Dherua, Jhargram district, West Bengal; India
- Coordinates: 22.421291°N 87.062642°E
- Elevation: 81 m (266 ft)
- System: Passenger train station
- Owner: Indian Railways
- Operator: South Eastern Railway
- Line: Howrah–Nagpur–Mumbai line
- Platforms: 3

Construction
- Structure type: Standard (on-ground station)

Other information
- Status: Functioning
- Station code: BNB
- Zone(s): South Eastern Railway zone
- Division(s): Kharagpur

History
- Former names: Bengal Nagpur Railway
Location
- Location within India Location within West Bengal

Banstala railway station is a railway station on Howrah–Nagpur–Mumbai line under Kharagpur railway division of South Eastern Railway zone. It is situated at Dherua in Jhargram district in the Indian state of West Bengal. It is 33 km (21 mi) from Kharagpur Junction.
