= Kanak Durga Temple =

Hindu temple dedicated to Devi Durga

- কনক দুর্গা মন্দির
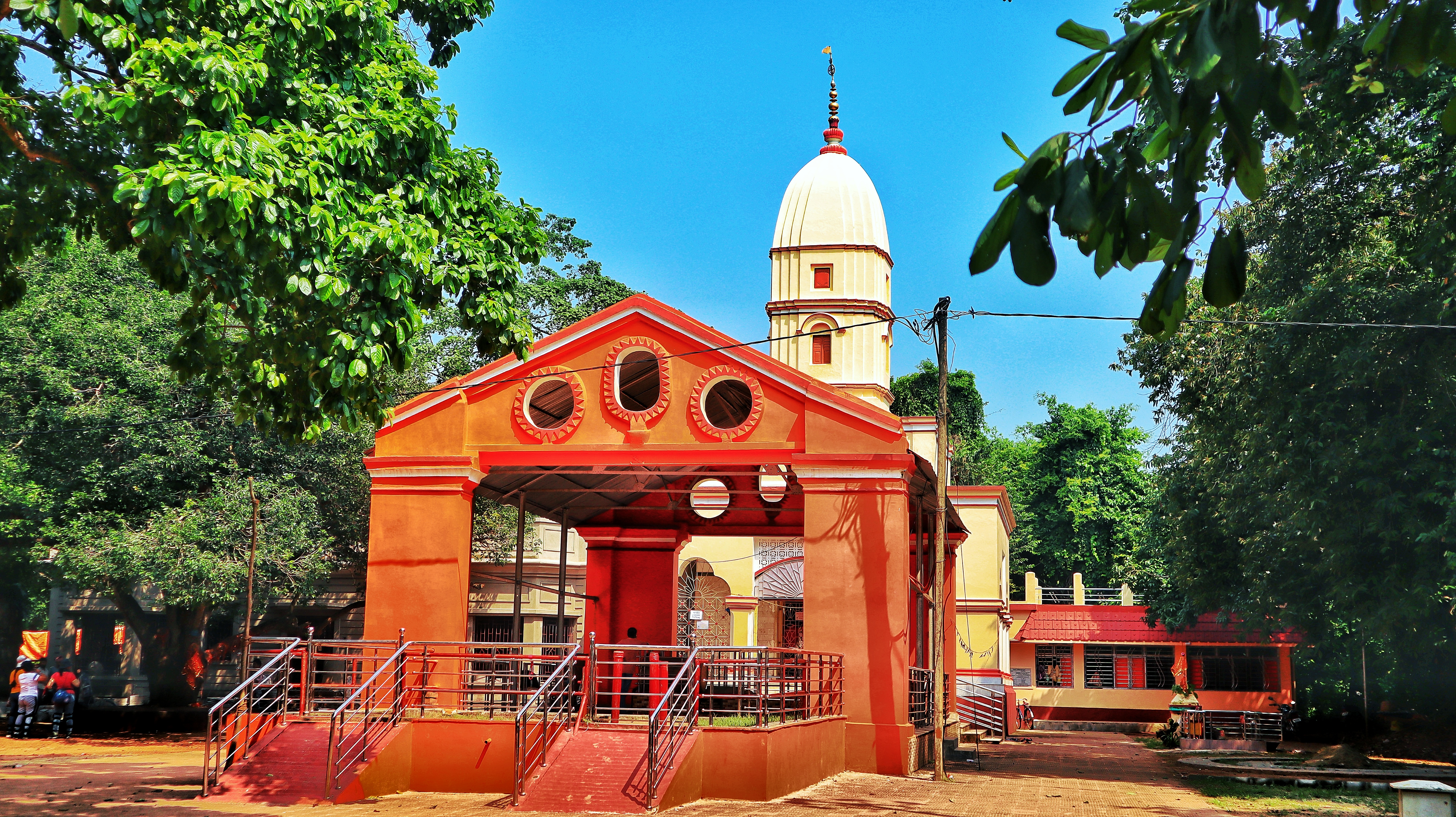

- Location in India Kanak Durga Temple (West Bengal)

Religion
- Affiliation: Hinduism
- District: Jhargram
- Deity: Durga
- Festival: Durga Puja

Location
- Location: Chilkigarh
- State: West Bengal
- Country: India
- Interactive map of Kanak Durga Temple
- Coordinates: 22°27′15″N 86°52′54″E

Architecture
- Established: 500 years ago (approximately)

Website
- jhargram.gov.in/kanak-durga-temple

Kanak Durga Temple is a Hindu temple dedicated to Devi Durga, located at Chilkigarh, Jhargram district in West Bengal.

== About ==
The Kanak Durga Temple is laying on the bank of Dulung river, which is 14 kilometers away from Jhargram town. The family of Ramchandra Sarangi, a Brahmin from Odisha, is the family priest of the Jhargram royal family, is also the priest of this temple through generations.

== History ==
History says that the feudal king of Chilakigarh, Gopinath Singh, built this temple. Following a divine dream, he crafted the idol using his wife's bangles. Locals say that once upon a time human sacrifices offered to Deity until the blood reached Dulung river (following down the temple). However, following the goddess's directive, this practice was stopped. Yet, animal sacrifices, specifically goat sacrifices, still occur. This takes place on the night of Ashtami, deep within the nearby forest. Only members of the royal family participate in the night worship. Locals believe that on Navami, the offerings are cooked by Goddess Durga herself. During the Maoist era, the statue was stolen twice in 2007–2008. A new idol made of Ashtadhatu (an alloy of eight metals) was created. CCTV cameras were installed in the temple. The Kanak Durga Temple has also made its place on the tourism map of West Bengal. There is a vast herbal forest adjacent to the temple.
