= Belpahari =

- Village
- Belpahari Bus stand

- Location in West Bengal, India Belpahari (India)
- Coordinates: 22.6331°N 86.7646°E
- Country: India
- State: West Bengal
- District: Jhargram
- Subdivision: Jhargram

Languages
  - Official: Bengali, Santali, Kudmali/Kurmali, English
- Time zone: UTC+5:30 (IST)
- ISO 3166 code: IN-WB
- Vehicle registration: WB-49/WB-50
- Website: jhargram.gov.in

Belpahari is a village in the Binpur II CD block in the Jhargram subdivision of the Jhargram district in West Bengal, India.

It had been in the frontline frequently for the killings of Communist Party of India (Marxist) leaders and supporters repeatedly by the Communist Party of India (Maoist) guerrillas.

== Geography ==
Cities and towns in Jhargram subdivision of Jhargram district
CT: census town, R: rural/ urban centre, H: historical/ religious centre
Owing to space constraints in the small map, the actual locations in a larger map may vary slightly

=== Location ===
Belpahari is located in 22.6331°N 86.7646°E.

=== Area overview ===
Jhargram subdivision, the only one in Jhargram district, shown in the map alongside, is composed of hills, mounds and rolling lands. It is rather succinctly described in the District Human Development Report, 2011 (at that time it was part of Paschim Medinipur district), “The western boundary is more broken and picturesque, for the lower ranges of the Chhotanagpur Hills line the horizon, the jungle assumes the character of forest, and large trees begin to predominate. The soil, however, is lateritic, a considerable area is unproductive, almost uninhabited, especially in the extreme north-west where there are several hills over 1000 feet in height. The remainder of the country is an almost level plain broken only by the sand hills.” 3.48% of the population lives in urban areas and 96.52% lives in the rural areas. 20.11% of the total population belonged to scheduled castes and 29.37% belonged to scheduled tribes.

Note: The map alongside presents some of the notable locations in the subdivision. All places marked in the map are linked in the larger full screen map.

== Demographics ==
As per 2011 Census of India Belpahari had a total population of 1,863 of which 908 (49%) were males and 955 (51%) were females. Population below 6 years was 224. The total number of literates in Belpahari was 1,245 (76% of the population over 6 years).

== Civic administration ==
=== CD block HQ ===
The headquarters of Binpur II CD block are located at Belpahari.

=== Police station ===
Belpahari police station has jurisdiction over a part of Binpur II CD block.

== Transport ==
State Highway 5 (West Bengal) running from Rupnarayanpur (in Bardhaman district) to Junput (in Purba Medinipur district) passes through Belpahari.

== Healthcare ==
Belpahari Rural Hospital, with 30 beds at Belpahari, is the major government medical facility in the Binpur II CD block.

== See also ==
- Shilda
- Binpur
- Lalgarh
