= Silda camp attack =

2010 Naxalite attack in West Bengal, India

Silda attack
- Part of Naxalite-Maoist insurgency
- Jhargram district (then Paschim Medinipur district), where the attack occurred
Date	15 February 2010
Location	Silda, West Bengal (India)
Result	Maoist victory

Belligerents
Communist Party of India (Maoist)	India (Eastern Frontier Rifles)

Commanders and leaders
Jagari Baskey; Kishenji	

Strength
~70	51

Casualties and losses
3 or 4 killed	24 killed Several missing, feared captured
- 1 civilian killed

The Silda camp attack occurred on 15 February 2010, when dozens of Naxalite Maoist insurgents ambushed Indian security forces in Silda (some 60 km from Midnapore) in West Bengal, India. The resulting death of 24 paramilitary personnel of the Eastern Frontier Rifles, and several believed to be abducted, made the attack a hard blow to the government's fight against the rebels.

Maoist gang leader Syam Saran Tudu was arrested in April 2013. He was facing murder and other charges, besides his role in the attack.
