= Jungle Mahal Zoological Park =

Junglemahal Zoological Park
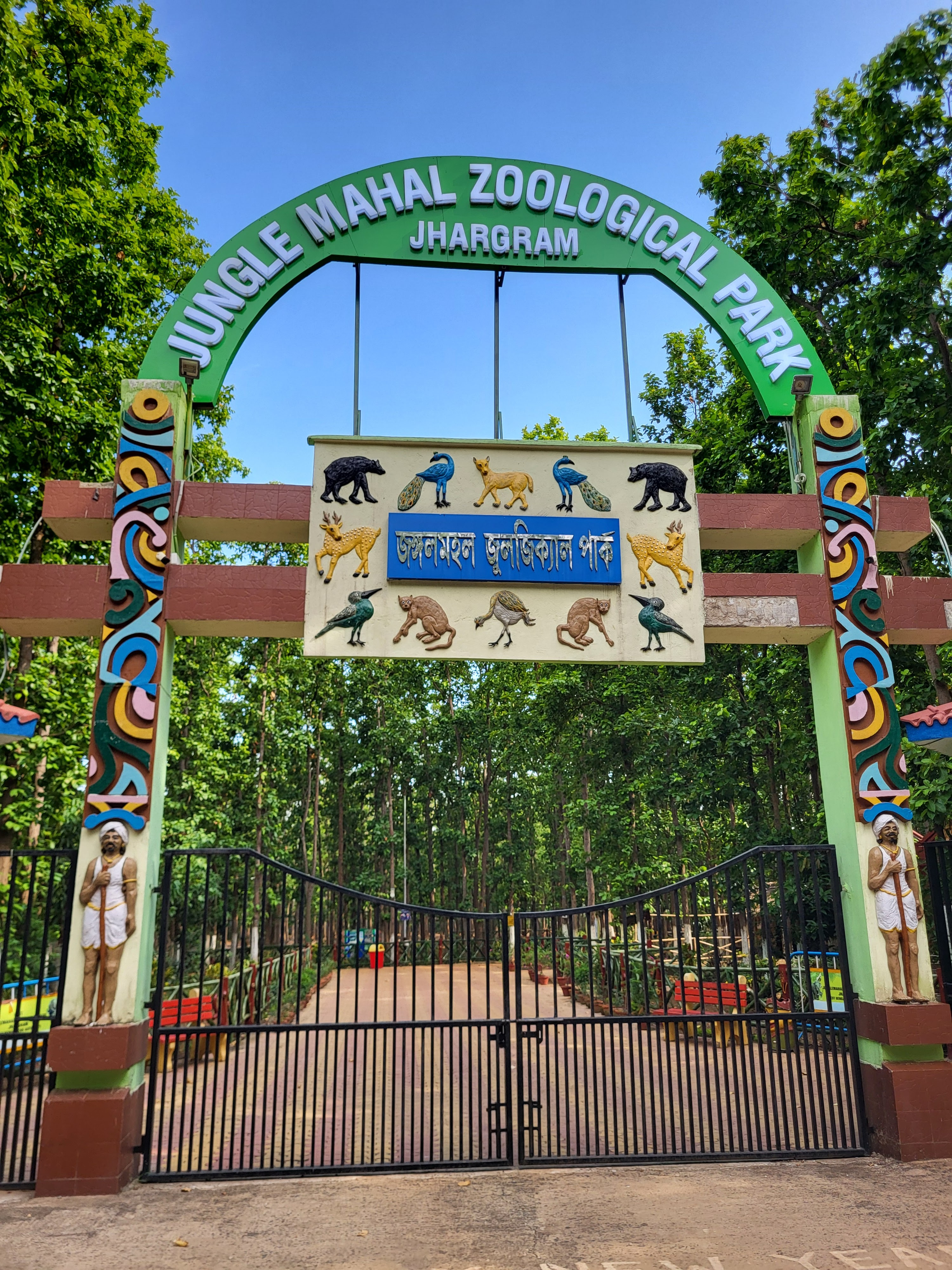
- Junglemahal Zoological Park
- Interactive map of Junglemahal Zoological Park
- 22.448897°N 87.020327°E
- Date opened: 1980
- Location: Jhargram, West Bengal, India
- Land area: 22.98 ha (56.8 acres)
- No. of animals: 334
- No. of species: 51
- Annual visitors: 1,36,556
- Memberships: CZA, WBZA

The Junglemahal Zoological Park (also informally called as Jhargram Zoological Park or Jhargram Mini Zoo) is a zoological park and a big tourist attraction in Jhargram, West Bengal.

Junglemahal Zoological Park is a recognized 'Medium' category Zoo by the Central Zoo Authority of India (CZAI). The CZA evaluates Zoos on periodic basis and stipulates conditions for their improvement.

== History ==
Junglemahal Zoological Park was established in 1980 as a deer park. It was accredited as a mini zoo in 2005. In 2014 it was changed to a major zoo and given the name Junglemahal Zoological Park by the Government of West Bengal. It was designated a medium zoo by the Central Zoo Authority in 2017.

== Attractions ==
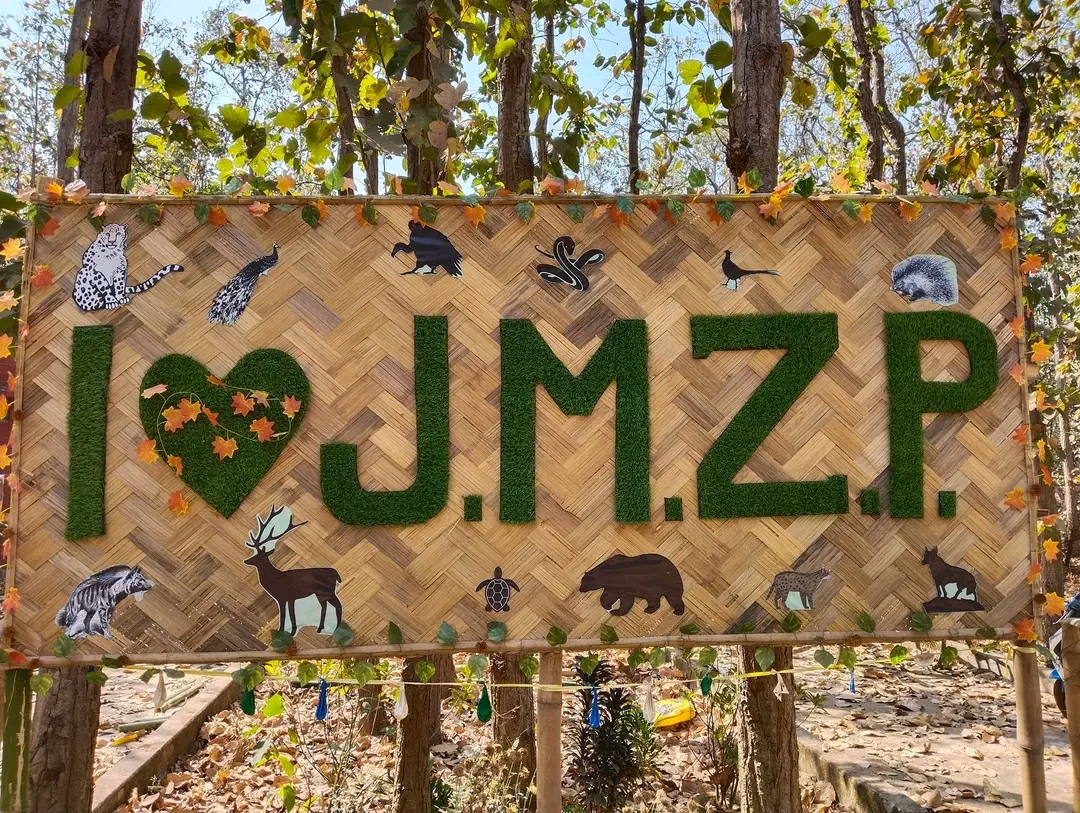
Selfie point at JMZP

In 2021–22, the zoo was home to 187 mammals, 84 birds and 63 reptiles.

=== Mammals ===
- Sloth bear
- Fishing cat
- Jungle cat
- Asian palm civet
- Indian elephant
- Indian fox
- Golden jackal
- Languor
- Rhesus macaque
- Indian pangolin
- Brush-tailed porcupine
- Rhesus macaque
- Bengal tiger
- Sambar deer
- Barking deer
- chital
- Nilgai
- Striped hyena

=== Birds ===
- Peafowl
- Hawk
- Common hill myna
- Hornbill
- Kalij pheasant
- White-rumped vulture
- Red junglefowl
- Cockatiel
- Finches
- Monk parakeet
- Golden pheasant
- Red junglefowl
- Black headed munia
- Alexandrine parakeet
- Red-breasted parakeet
- Rose-ringed parakeet
- Greater adjutant
- Emu

=== Reptiles ===
- Marsh crocodile
- Indian spectacled cobra
- Gharial
- Mugger crocodile
- Red-eared slider
- Indian star tortoise

== Gallery ==
Jungle Mahal Zoological Park
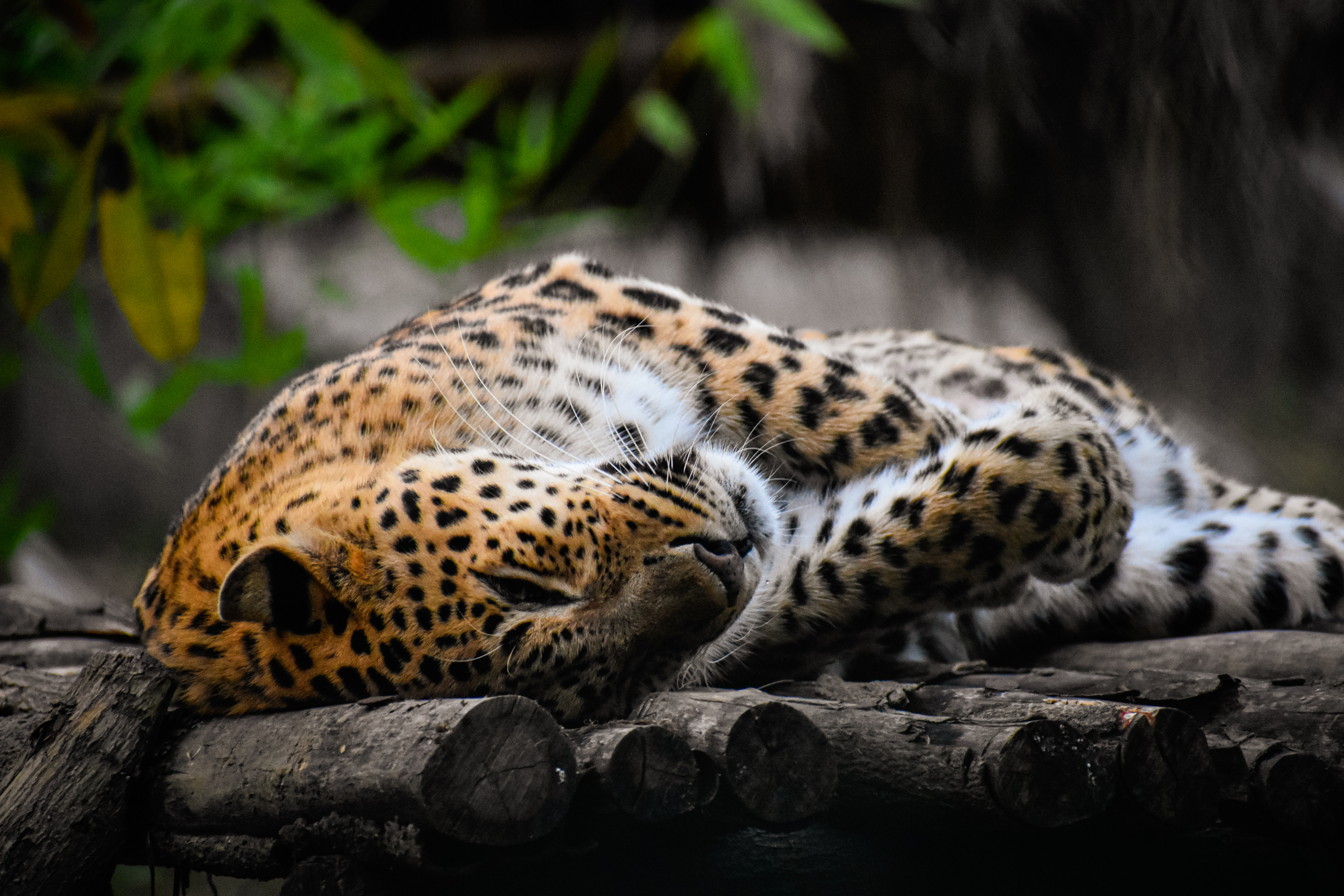
Leopard

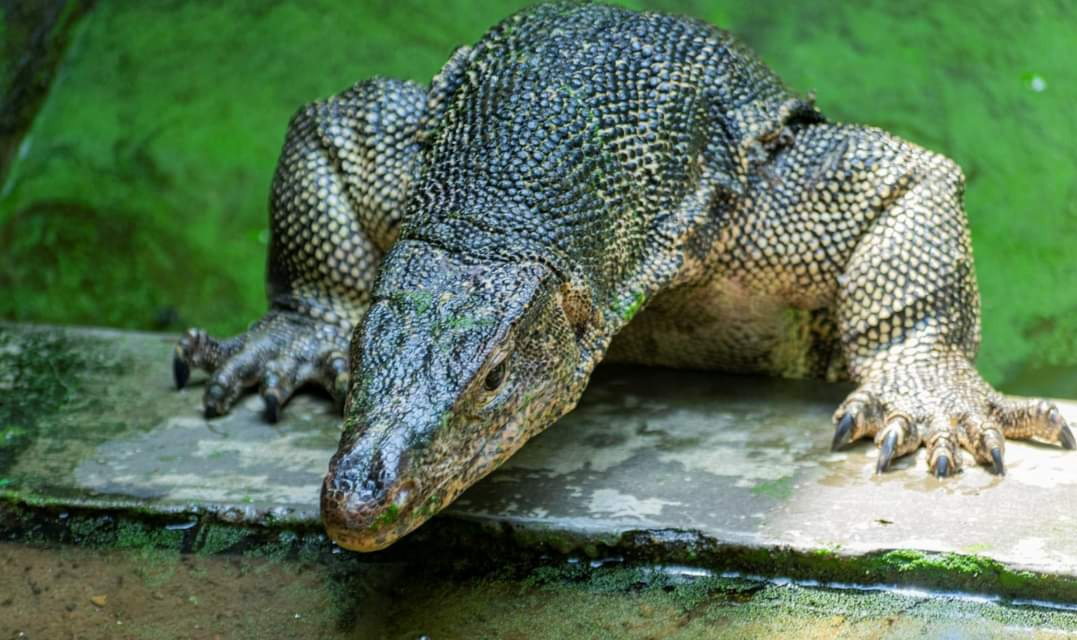
Monitor Lizard

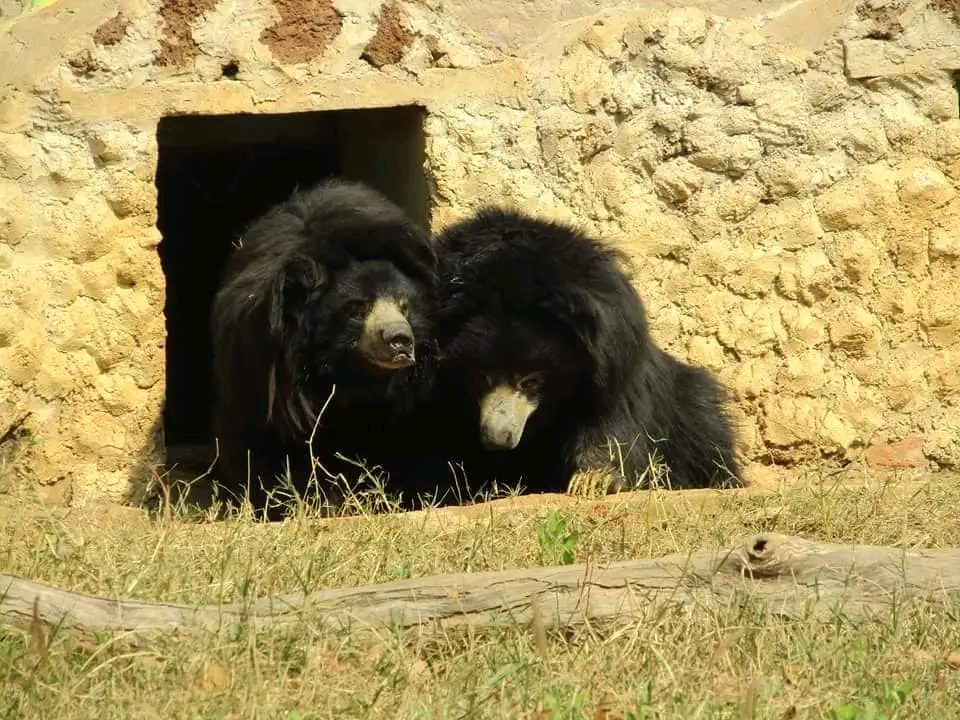
Sloth Bear

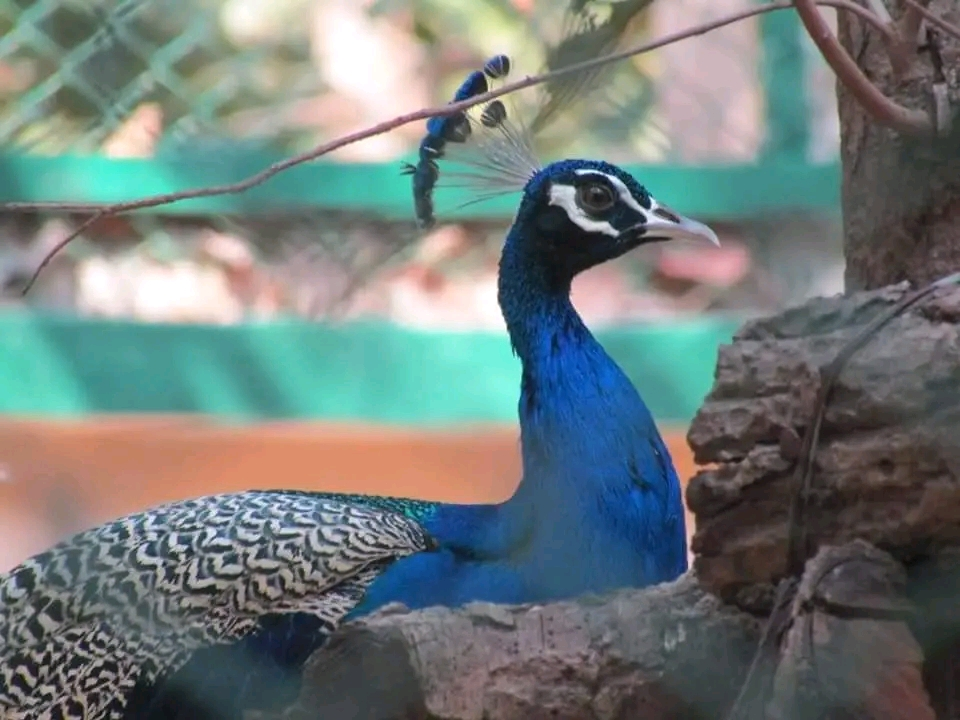
Peacock

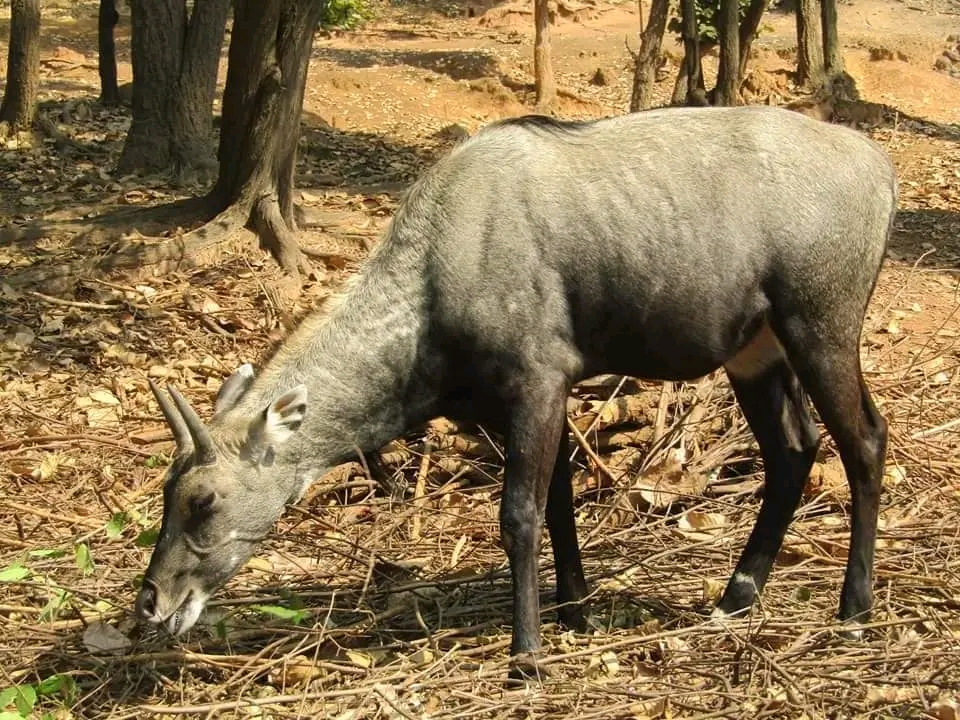
Nilgai

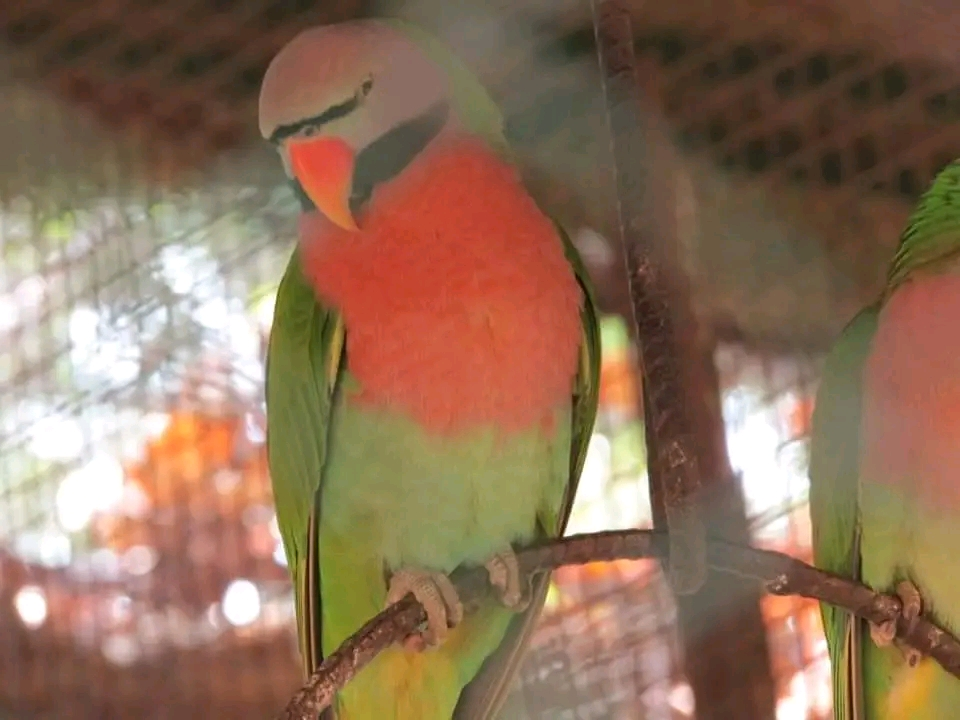
Red Breasted Parrot

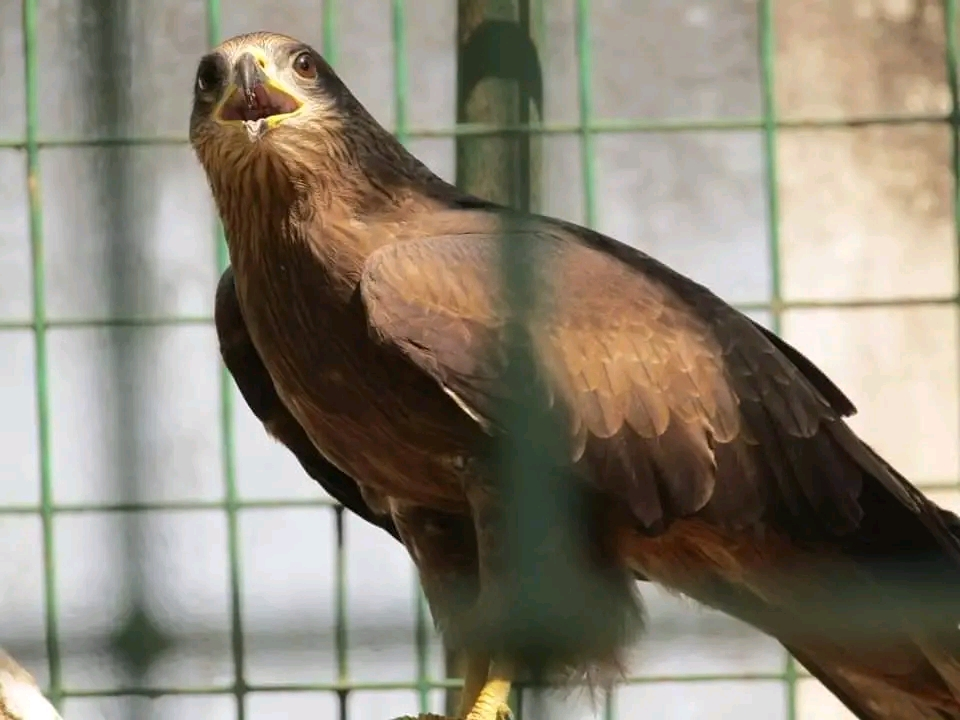
Hawk

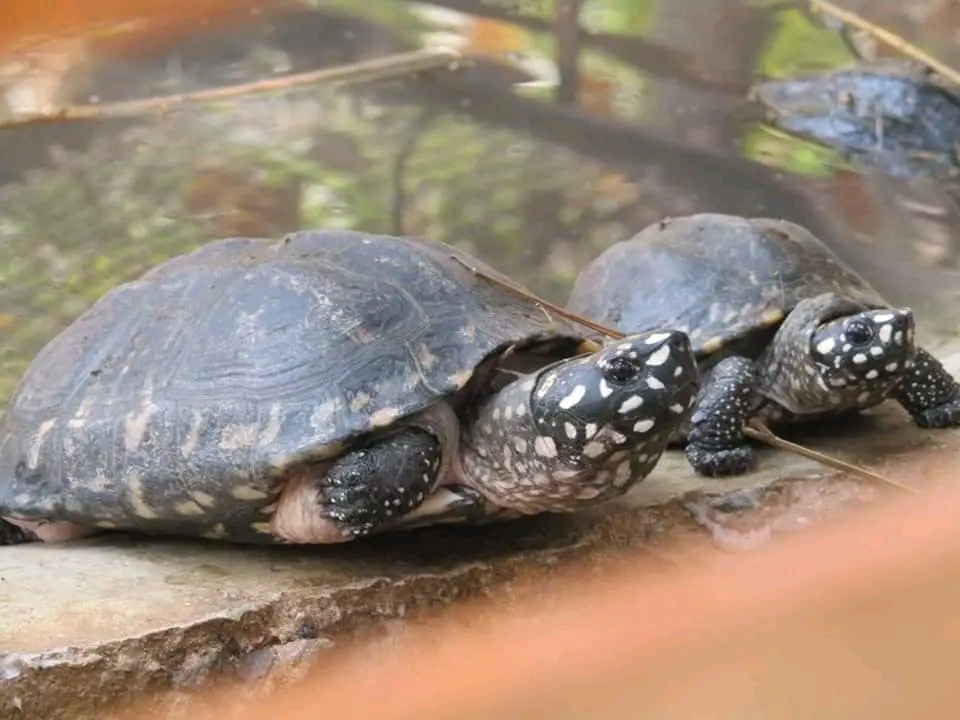
Black Pound Turtle

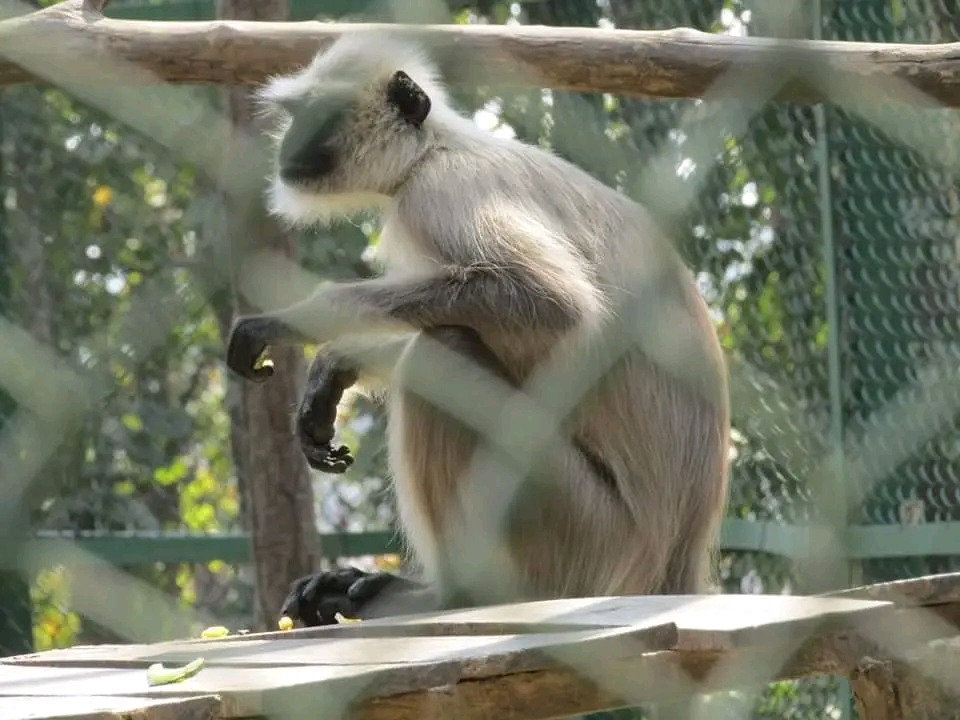
Common Langur

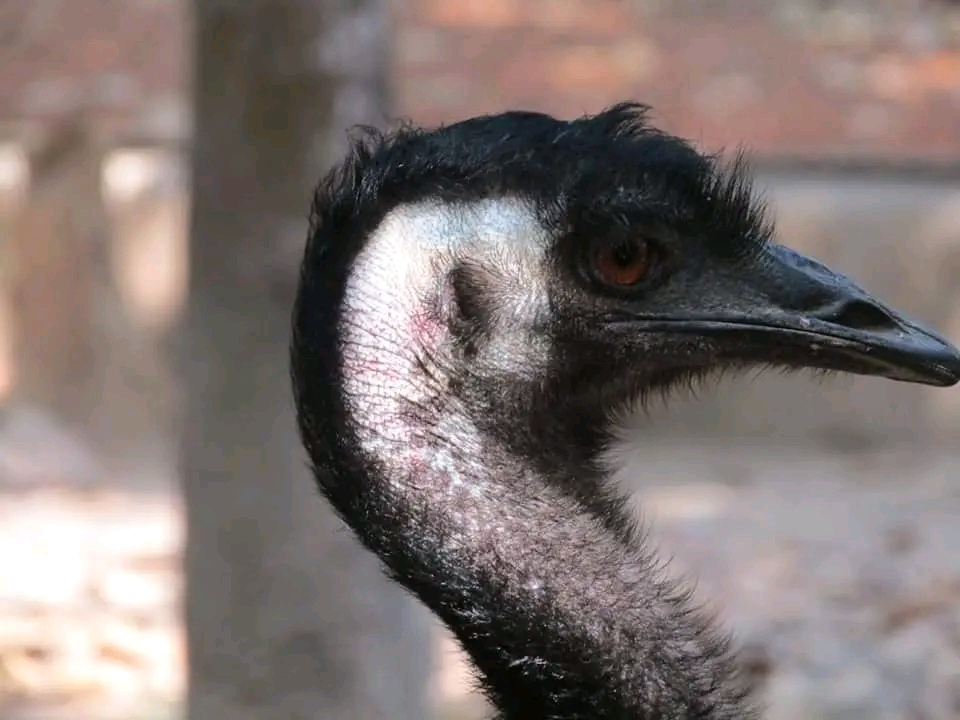
Emu

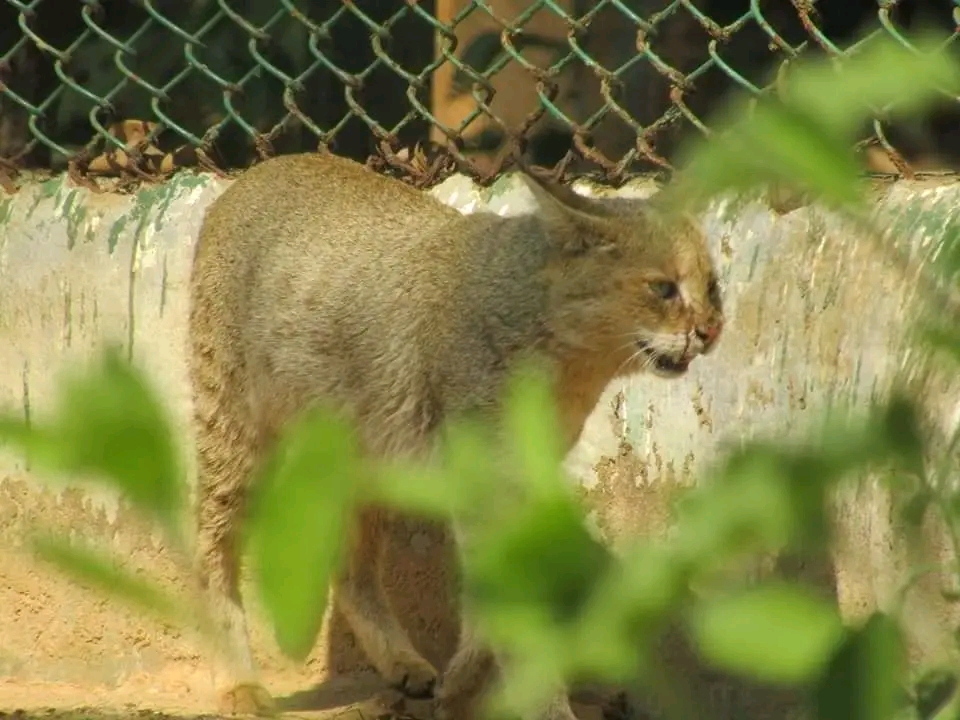
Wild Cat

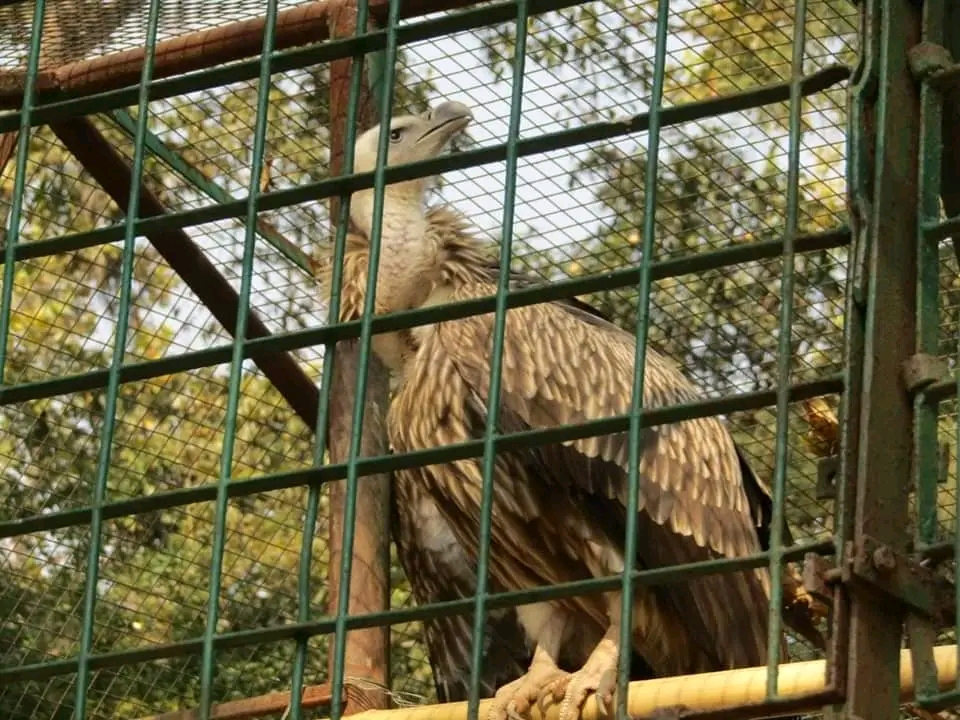
Vulture

== See also ==
- Zoological Garden, Alipore
- Padmaja Naidu Himalayan Zoological Park
