= Binpur II =

Binpur II Belpahari
- Community development block
- Coordinates: 22.577189°N 87.0049416°E
- Country: India
- State: West Bengal
- District: Jhargram

Government
  - Type: Federal democracy

Area
  - Total: 583.50 km^{2} (225.29 sq mi)
- Elevation: 83 m (272 ft)

Population (2011)
  - Total: 164,522
  - Density: 281.96/km^{2} (730.27/sq mi)

Languages
  - Official: Bengali, Santali, Kudmali/Kurmali, English
- Time zone: UTC+5:30 (IST)
- PIN: 721501 (Belpahari); 721515 (Silda)
- Area code: 03221
- ISO 3166 code: IN-WB
- Vehicle registration: WB-34
- Literacy: 70.46%
- Lok Sabha constituency: Jhargram
- Vidhan Sabha constituency: Binpur
- Website: jhargarm.gov.in

Binpur II is a community development block that forms an administrative division in Jhargram subdivision of Jhargram district in the Indian state of West Bengal.

== History ==
=== Lalgarh movement ===
The Lalgarh movement started attracting attention after the failed assassination attempt on Buddhadeb Bhattacharjee, then chief minister of West Bengal, in the Salboni area, on 2 November 2008 and the police action that followed. The movement was not just a political struggle but an armed struggle that concurrently took the look of a social struggle. A large number of CPI (M) activists, and others active in different political parties, were killed. Although the epi-centre of the movement was Lalgarh, it was spread across 19 police stations in three adjoining districts – Paschim Medinipur, Bankura and Purulia, all thickly forested and near the border with Jharkhand. The deployment of CRPF and other forces started on 11 June 2009. The movement came to an end after the 2011 state assembly elections and change of government in West Bengal. The death of Kishenji, the Maoist commander, on 24 November 2011 was the last major landmark.

From 2009 Maoist violence had rapidly spread across eleven western CD blocks of the district: Binpur I, Binpur II, Salboni, Grahbeta II, Jamboni, Jhargram, Midnapore Sadar, Gopiballavpur I, Gopiballavpur II, Sankrail and Nayagram.

=== Shilda attack ===
In an attack on a fortified camp of CRPF at Silda, West Bengal on 15 February 2010 a 100 strong heavily armed gang of Maoists killed 24 jawans.

=== Red corridor ===
106 districts spanning 10 states across India, described as being part of left wing extremism activities, constitutes the Red corridor. In West Bengal the districts of Paschim Medinipur, Bankura, Purulia and Birbhum are part of the Red corridor. However, as of July 2016, there had been no reported incidents of Maoist related activities from these districts for the previous 4 years. In the period 2009-2011 LWE violence resulted in more than 500 deaths and a similar number missing in Paschim Medinipur district.

== Geography ==
The Chota Nagpur Plateau gradually slopes down creating an undulating area with infertile laterite rocks/ soil. In Binpur II CD block 95% of the cultivated area has lateritic soil and 5% has alluvial soil. Binpur II CD block is drought prone with a particularly severe drought situation.

Belpahari is located at 22°31′56″N 86°38′45″E.

Binpur II CD block is bounded by Raipur and Ranibandh CD blocks in Bankura district in the north, Binpur I CD block in the east, Jamboni CD block and Ghatshila CD block in Purvi Singhbum district of Jharkhand in the south and Bandwan CD block in Purulia district in the west.

It is located 53 km from Midnapore, the district headquarters.

Binpur II CD block has an area of 583.50 km^{2}. It has 1 panchayat samity, 10 gram panchayats, 128 gram sansads (village councils), 470 mouzas and 401 inhabited villages. Belpahari and Binpur police stations serve this block. Headquarters of this CD block is at Belpahari.

Binpur II CD Block had a forest cover of 13,694 hectares, against a total geographical area of 57,574 hectares in 2005-06.

Gram panchayats of Binpur II block/ panchayat samiti are: Banspahari, Bhulaveda, Kanko, Shimulpal, Belpahari, Ergoda, Sandapara, Bhelaidiha, Harda, Shilda.

== Demographics ==
=== Population ===
According to the 2011 Census of India, Binpur II CD block had a total population of 164,522, of which 158,798 were rural and 5,724 were urban. There were 82,654 (50%) males and 81,868 (50%) females. Population in the age range 0–6 years was 19,354. Scheduled Castes numbered 25,947 (15.77%) and Scheduled Tribes numbered 65,722 (39.95%).

According to the 2001 census, Binpur II block had a total population of 145,913, out of which 73,633 were males and 72,280 were females. Binpur II block registered a population growth of 12.20 per cent during the 1991-2001 decade. Decadal growth for the combined Midnapore district was 14.87 per cent. Decadal growth in West Bengal was 17.45 per cent.

Census town in Binpur II CD block is (2011 census figure in brackets): Shilda (5,724).

Villages in Binpur II CD block included (2011 census figures in brackets): Belpahari (1,863), Banspahari (1,402), Bhula Bheda (961), Simulpal (1,171), Sondapara (1,219), Bheladiha (207), Kanko (1,124), Ergoda (1,408) and Harda (2,627).

=== Literacy ===
According to the 2011 census the total number of literate persons in Binpur II CD block was 102,285 (70.46% of the population over 6 years) out of which males numbered 58,804 (80.79% of the male population over 6 years) and females numbered 43,481 (60.07% of the female population over 6 years). The gender gap in literacy rates was 20.72%.

See also – List of West Bengal districts ranked by literacy rate

Literacy in CD blocks of
Paschim Medinipur district
Jhargram subdivision
Binpur I – 69.74%
Binpur II – 70.46%
Gopiballavpur I – 65.44%
Gopiballavpur II – 71.40%
Jamboni – 72.63%
Jhargram – 72.23%
Nayagram – 63.70%
Sankrail – 73.35%
Medinipur Sadar subdivision
Garhbeta I – 72.21%
Garhbeta II – 75.87%
Garhbeta III – 73.42%
Keshpur – 77.88%
Midnapore Sadar – 70.48%
Salboni – 74.87%
Ghatal subdivision
Chandrakona I – 78.93%
Chandrakona II – 75.96%
Daspur I – 83.99%
Daspur II – 85.62%
Ghatal – 81.08%
Kharagpur subdivision
Dantan I – 73.53%
Dantan II – 82.45%
Debra – 82.03%
Keshiari – 76.78%
Kharagpur I – 77.06%
Kharagpur II – 76.08%
Mohanpur – 80.51%
Narayangarh – 78.31%
Pingla – 83.57%
Sabang – 86.84%
2011 Census: CD Block Wise

Primary Census Abstract Data

=== Language and religion ===
Religion in Binpur II CD block (2011)
Hinduism	73.68%
Other (tribal religion)	24.60%
Islam	0.74%
Other or not stated	0.98%

In the 2011 census Hindus numbered 121,224 and formed 73.68% of the population in Binpur II CD block. Muslims numbered 1,220 and formed 0.74% of the population. Others numbered 42,078 and formed 25.58% of the population. Others include Addi Bassi, Marang Boro, Santal, Saranath, Sari Dharma, Sarna, Alchchi, Bidin, Sant, Saevdharm, Seran, Saran, Sarin, Kheria, Christians and other religious communities. In 2001, Hindus were 60.29%, Muslims 0.59% and tribal religions 38.68% of the population respectively.

Languages of Binpur II CD block (2011)
1. Bengali (71.6%)
2. Santali (25.3%)
3. Kurmali (2.71%)
4. Others (0.41%)

At the time of the 2011 census, 71.61% of the population spoke Bengali, 25.27% Santali and 2.71% Kurmali as their first language.

== BPL families ==
In Binpur II CD block 68.59% families were living below poverty line in 2007.

According to the District Human Development Report of Paschim Medinipur: The 29 CD blocks of the district were classified into four categories based on the poverty ratio. Nayagram, Binpur II and Jamboni CD blocks have very high poverty levels (above 60%). Kharagpur I, Kharagpur II, Sankrail, Garhbeta II, Pingla and Mohanpur CD blocks have high levels of poverty (50-60%), Jhargram, Midnapore Sadar, Dantan I, Gopiballavpur II, Binpur I, Dantan II, Keshiari, Chandrakona I, Gopiballavpur I, Chandrakona II, Narayangarh, Keshpur, Ghatal, Sabang, Garhbeta I, Salboni, Debra and Garhbeta III CD blocks have moderate levels of poverty (25-50%) and Daspur II and Daspur I CD blocks have low levels of poverty (below 25%).

== Economy ==
=== Infrastructure ===
400 or 85% of mouzas in Binpur II CD block were electrified by 31 March 2014.

403 mouzas in Binpur II CD block had drinking water facilities in 2013-14. There were 19 fertiliser depots, 8 seed stores and 52 fair price shops in the CD block.

=== Agriculture ===
Persons engaged in agriculture
in Binpur II CD block
1. Bargadars (2.52%)
2. Patta holders (27.8%)
3. Small farmers (2.67%)
4. Marginal farmers (19.7%)
5. Agricultural labourers (47.3%)

Although the Bargadari Act of 1950 recognised the rights of bargadars to a higher share of crops from the land that they tilled, it was not fully implemented. Large tracts, beyond the prescribed limit of land ceiling, remained with the rich landlords. From 1977 onwards major land reforms took place in West Bengal. Land in excess of land ceiling was acquired and distributed amongst the peasants. Following land reforms land ownership pattern has undergone transformation. In 2013-14, persons engaged in agriculture in Binpur II CD block could be classified as follows: bargadars 2.52%, patta (document) holders 27.79%, small farmers (possessing land between 1 and 2 hectares) 2.67%, marginal farmers (possessing land up to 1 hectare) 19.70% and agricultural labourers 47.32%.

In 2005-06 net cropped area in Binpur II CD block was 21,870 hectares and the area in which more than one crop was grown was 13,694 hectares.

The extension of irrigation has played a role in growth of the predominantly agricultural economy. In 2013-14, the total area irrigated in Binpur II CD block was 6,983 hectares, out of which 4,500 by canal water, 575 hectares by tank water, 805 hectares by shallow tube wells, 178 hectares by river lift irrigation, 125 hectares by open dug wells and 800 hectares by other methods.

In 2013-14, Binpur II CD block produced 106,313 tonnes of Aman paddy, the main winter crop, from 42,235 hectares, 1,617 tonnes of Boro paddy (spring crop) from 550 hectares, 25 tonnes of wheat from 17 hectares and 24,526 tonnes of potatoes from 975 hectares. It also produced mustard.

=== Banking ===
In 2013-14, Binpur II CD block had offices of 12 commercial banks.

== Transport ==
Binpur II CD block has 23 originating/ terminating bus routes. The block headquarters are 25 km from nearest railway station.

State Highway 9 running from Durgapur (in Paschim Bardhaman district) to Nayagram (in Jhargram district) passes through this CD block.

== Education ==
In 2013-14, Binpur II CD block had 190 primary schools with 11,767 students, 26 middle schools with 1,255 students and 21 higher secondary schools with 17,450 students. Binpur II CD block had 1 general college with 751 students and 565 institutions for special and non-formal education with 13,687 students.

The United Nations Development Programme considers the combined primary and secondary enrolment ratio as the simple indicator of educational achievement of the children in the school going age. The infrastructure available is important. In Binpur II CD block out of the total 190 primary schools in 2008-2009, 68 had pucca buildings, 32 partially pucca, 14 kacha and 76 multiple type.

Silda Chandra Sekhar College was established in 1971 at Silda. It is affiliated to Vidyasagar University. It offers courses in Bengali, Santali, English, Sanskrit, history, political science, commerce, physics, chemistry and mathematics.

== Healthcare ==
In 2014, Binpur II CD block had 1 rural hospital and 3 primary health centres with total 86 beds and 10 doctors. It had 36 family welfare sub centres and 1 family welfare centre. 8,966 patients were treated indoor and 107,833 patients were treated outdoor in the hospitals, health centres and subcentres of the CD block.

Belpahari Rural Hospital, with 30 beds at Belpahari, is the major government medical facility in the Binpur II CD block. There are primary health centres at: Ergoda (PO Ashakanthi) (with 6 beds), Odulchuan (with 10 beds) and Silda (with 6 beds).
