= Jamboni (community development block) =

- Community development block
- Coordinates: 22.451°N 86.879°E
- Country: India
- State: West Bengal
- District: Jhargram

Government
  - Type: Federal democracy

Area
  - Total: 318.83 km^{2} (123.10 sq mi)
- Elevation: 79 m (259 ft)

Population (2011)
  - Total: 113,197
  - Density: 355.04/km^{2} (919.55/sq mi)

Languages
  - Official: Bengali, Santali, Kudmali/Kurmali, English
- Time zone: UTC+5:30 (IST)
- PIN: 721505 (Gidhni); 721503 (Chilkigarh)
- Area code: 03221
- Vehicle registration: WB-34
- Literacy: 72.63%
- Lok Sabha constituency: Jhargram
- Vidhan Sabha constituency: Binpur
- Website: jhargram.gov.in Jamboni Block

Jamboni (also spelled Jambani) is a community development block that forms an administrative division in Jhargram subdivision of Jhargram district in the Indian state of West Bengal.

== History ==
=== Red corridor ===
106 districts spanning 10 states across India, described as being a part of the left wing extremism activities, constitutes the Red corridor. In West Bengal the districts of Pashim Medinipur, Bankura, Purulia and Birbhum are part of the Red corridor. However, as of July 2016, there has been no reported incidents of Maoist related activities from these districts for the previous 4 years. In the period 2009-2011 LWE violence resulted in more than 500 deaths and a similar number missing in Paschim Medinipur district.

The Lalgarh movement, which started attracting attention after the failed assassination attempt on Buddhadeb Bhattacharjee, then chief minister of West Bengal, in the Salboni area of Paschim Medinipur district, on 2 November 2008 and the police action that followed, had also spread over to these areas. The movement was not just a political struggle but an armed struggle that concurrently took the look of a social struggle. A large number of CPI (M) activists, and others active in different political parties, were killed. Although the epi-centre of the movement was Lalgarh, it was spread across 19 police stations in three adjoining districts – Paschim Medinipur, Bankura and Purulia, all thickly forested and near the border with Jharkhand. The deployment of CRPF and other forces started on 11 June 2009. The movement came to an end after the 2011 state assembly elections and change of government in West Bengal. The death of Kishenji, the Maoist commander, on 24 November 2011 was the last major landmark.

From 2009 Maoist violence had rapidly spread across eleven western CD blocks of the district: Binpur I, Binpur II, Salboni, Grahbeta II, Jamboni, Jhargram, Midnapore Sadar, Gopiballavpur I, Gopiballavpur II, Sankrail and Nayagram.

== Geography ==
The Chota Nagpur Plateau gradually slopes down creating an undulating area with infertile laterite rocks/ soil. In Jamboni CD block 85% of the cultivated area has lateritic soil and 15% has alluvial soil. Jamboni CD block is drought prone with a particularly severe drought situation.

Gidhni is located at 22°27′04″N 86°52′44″E.

Jamboni CD block is bounded by Binpur II and Binpur I CD blocks in the north, Jhargram CD block in the east, Gopiballavpur II CD Bblock in the south and Chakulia and Dhalbhumgarh CD blocks, in East Singhbhum district in Jharkhand, in the west.

It is located 13 km to the west of Jhargram town, the district headquarters.

Jamboni CD block has an area of 318.83 km^{2}. It has 1 panchayat samity, 10 gram panchayats, 85 gram sansads (village councils), 338 mouzas and 281 inhabited villages. Jamboni police station serves this block. Headquarters of this CD block is at Gidhni.

Jamboni CD block had a forest cover of 7,640 hectares, against a total geographical area of 33,110 hectares in 2005–06.

Gram panchayats of Jamboni block/ panchayat samiti are: Chichra, Chilkigarh, Dharsa, Dubra, Gidhni, Jamboni, Kapgari, Kenddangri and Parihati.

== Demographics ==
=== Population ===
According to the 2011 Census of India, Jamboni CD block had a total population of 113,197, all of which were rural. There were 57,607 (51%) males and 55,590 (49%) females. Population in the age range 0–6 years was 13,582. Scheduled Castes numbered 20,484 (18.10%) and Scheduled Tribes numbered 32,369 (28.60%).

According to 2001 census, Jamboni block had a total population of 101,715, out of which 51,868 were males and 49,847 were females. Jamboni block registered a population growth of 12.83 per cent during the 1991-2001 decade. Decadal growth for the combined Midnapore district was 14.87 per cent. Decadal growth in West Bengal was 17.45 per cent.

Large villages (with 4,000+ population) in Jamboni CD block are (2011 census figures in brackets): Parihati (4,312).

Other villages in Jamboni CD block included (2011 census figures in brackets): Jamboni (886), Gidhni (1,935), Chilkigarh (1,553), Kapgari (1,225) and Chichra (3,116).

=== Literacy ===
According to the 2011 census, the total number of literate persons in Jamboni CD block was 72,348 (72.63% of the population over 6 years) out of which males numbered 41,574 (82.04% of the male population over 6 years) and females numbered 30,774 (62.88% of the female population over 6 years). The gender gap in literacy rates was 19.15%.

See also – List of West Bengal districts ranked by literacy rate

Literacy in CD blocks of
Paschim Medinipur district
Jhargram subdivision
Binpur I – 69.74%
Binpur II – 70.46%
Gopiballavpur I – 65.44%
Gopiballavpur II – 71.40%
Jamboni – 72.63%
Jhargram – 72.23%
Nayagram – 63.70%
Sankrail – 73.35%
Medinipur Sadar subdivision
Garhbeta I – 72.21%
Garhbeta II – 75.87%
Garhbeta III – 73.42%
Keshpur – 77.88%
Midnapore Sadar – 70.48%
Salboni – 74.87%
Ghatal subdivision
Chandrakona I – 78.93%
Chandrakona II – 75.96%
Daspur I – 83.99%
Daspur II – 85.62%
Ghatal – 81.08%
Kharagpur subdivision
Dantan I – 73.53%
Dantan II – 82.45%
Debra – 82.03%
Keshiari – 76.78%
Kharagpur I – 77.06%
Kharagpur II – 76.08%
Mohanpur – 80.51%
Narayangarh – 78.31%
Pingla – 83.57%
Sabang – 86.84%
2011 Census: CD Block Wise

Primary Census Abstract Data

=== Language and religion ===
Religion in Jamboni CD block (2011)
| Hinduism | 77.70% |
| Other (tribal religion) | 15.15% |
| Islam | 6.78% |
| Other or not stated | 0.37% |

In the 2011 census Hindus numbered 87,957 and formed 77.70% of the population in Jamboni CD block. Muslims numbered 7,677 and formed 6.78% of the population. Others numbered 17,563 and formed 15.52% of the population. Others include Addi Bassi, Marang Boro, Santal, Saranath, Sari Dharma, Sarna, Alchchi, Bidin, Sant, Saevdharm, Seran, Saran, Sarin, Kheria, Christian and other religious communities. In 2001, Hindus were 67.56%, Muslims 6.31% and tribal religions 25.91% of the population respectively.

Languages of Jamboni CD block (2011)
1. Bengali (75.9%)
2. Santali (21.9%)
3. Hindi (1.52%)
4. Others (0.74%)

At the time of the 2011 census, 75.86% of the population spoke Bengali, 21.88% Santali and 1.52% Hindi as their first language.

== BPL families ==
In Jamboni CD block 67.11% families were living below poverty line in 2007.

According to the District Human Development Report of Paschim Medinipur: The 29 CD blocks of the district were classified into four categories based on the poverty ratio. Nayagram, Binpur II and Jamboni CD blocks have very high poverty levels (above 60%). Kharagpur I, Kharagpur II, Sankrail, Garhbeta II, Pingla and Mohanpur CD blocks have high levels of poverty (50-60%), Jhargram, Midnapore Sadar, Dantan I, Gopiballavpur II, Binpur I, Dantan II, Keshiari, Chandrakona I, Gopiballavpur I, Chandrakona II, Narayangarh, Keshpur, Ghatal, Sabang, Garhbeta I, Salboni, Debra and Garhbeta III CD blocks have moderate levels of poverty (25-50%) and Daspur II and Daspur I CD blocks have low levels of poverty (below 25%).

== Economy ==
=== Infrastructure ===
283 or 84% of mouzas in Jamboni CD block were electrified by 31 March 2014.

284 mouzas in Jamboni CD block had drinking water facilities in 2013–14. There were 31 fertiliser depots, 3 seed stores and 40 fair price shops in the CD block.

=== Agriculture ===
Persons engaged in agriculture
in Jamboni CD block
1. Bargadars (4.69%)
2. Patta holders (36.6%)
3. Small farmers (2.34%)
4. Marginal farmers (14.2%)
5. Agricultural labourers (42.3%)

Although the Bargadari Act of 1950 recognised the rights of bargadars to a higher share of crops from the land that they tilled, it was not fully implemented. Large tracts, beyond the prescribed limit of land ceiling, remained with the rich landlords. From 1977 onwards major land reforms took place in West Bengal. Land in excess of land ceiling was acquired and distributed amongst the peasants. Following land reforms land ownership pattern has undergone transformation. In 2013–14, persons engaged in agriculture in Jamboni CD block could be classified as follows: bargadars 4.69%, patta (document) holders 36.57%, small farmers (possessing land between 1 and 2 hectares) 2.34%, marginal farmers (possessing land up to 1 hectare) 14.15% and agricultural labourers 42.26%.

In 2005-06 net cropped area in Jamboni CD block was 20,450 hectares and the area in which more than one crop was grown was 10,843 hectares.

The extension of irrigation has played a role in growth of the predominantly agricultural economy. In 2013–14, the total area irrigated in Jamboni CD block was 4,140 hectares, out of which 900 hectares was by canal water, 240 hectares by tank water, 20 hectares by deep tubewells, 1,850 hectares by shallow tube wells, 450 hectares by river lift irrigation, 30 hectares by open dug wells and 650 hectares by other methods.

In 2013–14, Jamboni CD block produced 28,941 tonnes of Aman paddy, the main winter crop, from 14,703 hectares, 3,221 tonnes of Boro paddy (summer crop) from 1,106 hectares, 183 tonnes of wheat from 67 hectares and 20,749 tonnes of potatoes from 745 hectares. It also produced mustard and til.

=== Banking ===
In 2013–14, Jamboni CD block had offices of 7 commercial banks and 2 gramin banks.

== Transport ==
Jamboni CD block has 16 originating/ terminating bus routes.

The Kharagpur-Tatanagar line of South Eastern Railway passes through this CD block and there is a station at Gidhni,

State Highway 9 running from Durgapur (in Paschim Bardhaman district) to Nayagram (in Jhargram district) passes through this CD block.

== Education ==
In 2013–14, Jamboni CD block had 114 primary schools with 7.947 students, 17 middle schools with 801 students and 16 higher secondary schools with 11,375 students. Jamboni CD block had 1 general college with 670 students, 1 technical/ professional institution with 50 students and 272 institutions for special and non-formal education with 6,992 students.

The United Nations Development Programme considers the combined primary and secondary enrolment ratio as the simple indicator of educational achievement of the children in the school going age. The infrastructure available is important. In Jamboni CD block out of the total 113 primary schools in 2008–2009, 89 had pucca buildings, 3 partially pucca, 4 kucha and 17 multiple type.

Seva Bharati Mahavidyalaya at Kapgari was established in 1964 and is affiliated to Vidyasagar University. It offers honours courses in Bengali, Santali, English, history, philosophy, geography, mathematics, chemistry (proposed), anthropology and accountancy.

== Healthcare ==
In 2014, Jamboni CD block had 1 block primary health centre and 2 primary health centres with total 31 beds and 5 doctors. It had 25 family welfare sub centres and 1 family welfare centre. 3,106 patients were treated indoor and 80,593 patients were treated outdoor in the hospitals, health centres and subcentres of the CD block.

Chilkigarh Block Primary Health Centre, with 15 beds at Chilkigarh, is the major government medical facility in the Jamboni CD block. There are primary health centres at: Chinchira (with 10 beds), and Kapgari (with 6 beds).
