= Chilkigarh =

- Village
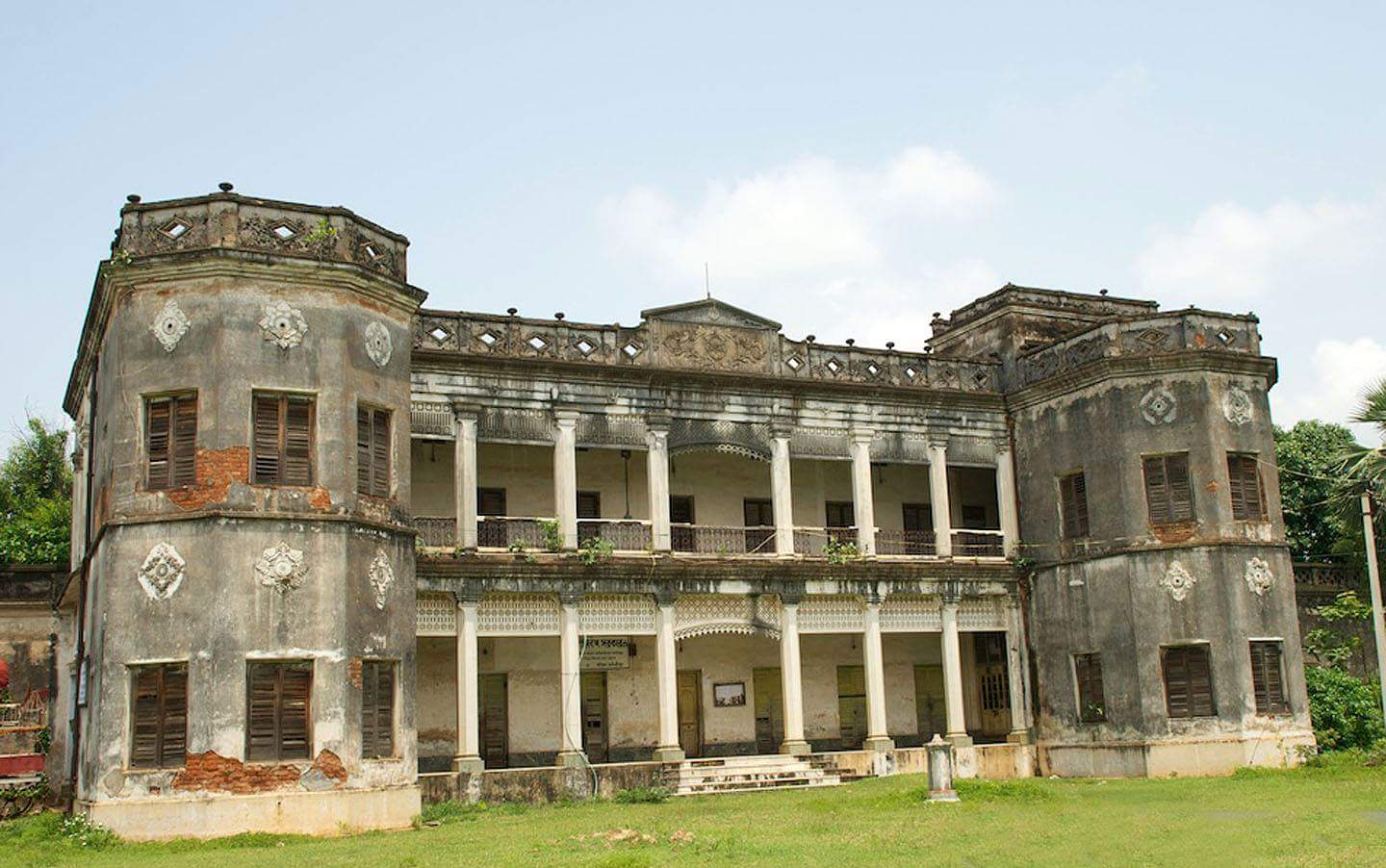
- Chilkgarh Rajbari

- Location in West Bengal, India Chilkigarh (India)
- Coordinates: 22°27′03.6″N 86°52′44.4″E
- Country: India
- State: West Bengal
- District: Jhargram

Population (2011)
  - Total: 1,553

Languages
  - Official: Bengali, Santali, English
- Time zone: UTC+5:30 (IST)
- PIN: 721503 (Chilkigarh)
- Telephone/STD code: 03221
- Lok Sabha constituency: Jhargram
- Vidhan Sabha constituency: Binpur
- Website: jhargram.gov.in

Chilkigarh is a village and a gram panchayat in Jamboni CD block in the Jhargram subdivision of the Jhargram district in the state of West Bengal, India.

== Geography ==
Cities and towns in Jhargram subdivision of Jhargram district
CT: census town, R: rural/ urban centre, H: historical/ religious centre
Owing to space constraints in the small map, the actual locations in a larger map may vary slightly

=== Location ===
Chilkigarh is located at 22°27′03.6″N 86°52′44.4″E

=== Area overview ===
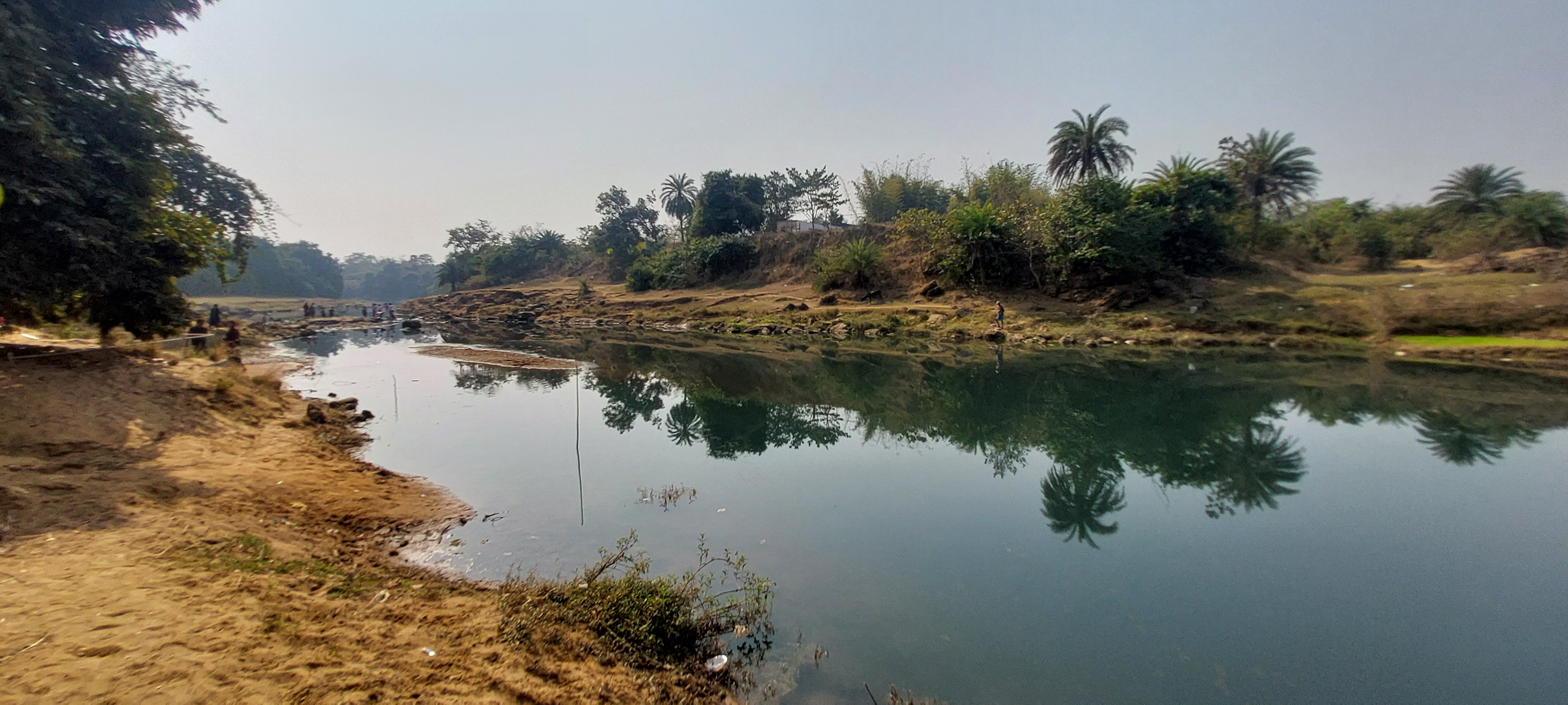
Dulung river at Chilkigarh

Jhargram subdivision, the only one in Jhargram district, shown in the map alongside, is composed of hills, mounds and rolling lands. It is rather succinctly described in the District Human Development Report, 2011 (at that time it was part of Paschim Medinipur district), “The western boundary is more broken and picturesque, for the lower ranges of the Chhotanagpur Hills line the horizon, the jungle assumes the character of forest, and large trees begin to predominate. The soil, however, is lateritic, a considerable area is unproductive, almost uninhabited, especially in the extreme north-west where there are several hills over 1000 feet in height. The remainder of the country is an almost level plain broken only by the sand hills.” 3.48% of the population lives in urban areas and 96.52% lives in the rural areas. 20.11% of the total population belonged to scheduled castes and 29.37% belonged to scheduled tribes.

Note: The map alongside presents some of the notable locations in the subdivision. All places marked in the map are linked in the larger full screen map.

== Demographics ==
According to the 2011 Census of India, Chilkigarh had a total population of 1,553 of which 794 (51%) were males and 759 (49%) were females. Population in the age range 0–6 years was 178. The total number of literate persons in Chilkigarh was 980 (63.10% of the population over 6 years).

== Transport ==
State Highway 9 from Durgapur (in Paschim Bardhaman district) to Nayagram (in Jhargram district) passes through Chilkigarh.

== Healthcare ==
Chilkigarh Block Primary Health Centre, with 15 beds at Chilkigarh, is the major government medical facility in the Jamboni CD block.

== Gallery ==
Chilkigarh village

Chilkigarh Raj Palace

Kanak Durga Temple complex at Chilkigarh
