= Silda, West Bengal =

Silda
- Census Town
- Silda Bus stand

- Location within West Bengal Location within India
- Coordinates: 22.6167778°N 86.8182685°E
- Country: India
- State: West Bengal
- District: Jhargram district
- Elevation: 112 m (367 ft)

Population (2011)
  - Total: 5,724

Languages
  - Official: Bengali, Santali, English
- Time zone: UTC+5:30 (IST)
- ISO 3166 code: IN-WB
- Vehicle registration: WB
- Website: jhargram.gov.in

Silda (or Shilda) is a census town in the Binpur II CD block in the Jhargram subdivision of the Jhargram district in the Indian state of West Bengal.

== History ==
=== Chuar revolt ===
A raja's palace is situated at Silda. The Raja of Silda state, Raja Mangobinda Roy, revolted against the British Government. This revolution is called Chuar Bidroho.

=== Silda Camp Attack, 2010 ===
On 15 February 2010, Maoists attacked Silda camp of Eastern Frontier Rifles in which 24 personnel or jawans were killed. The camp was located in the midst of bustling market area of Silda in West Midnapore district (now in Jhargram district ). The family of slain police personnel received compensation of Rs. 15 lakh from the Centre and the State, while Rs. 1 lakh was given to families of civilians killed by Maoists.

== Geography ==
Cities and towns in Jhargram subdivision of Jhargram district
CT: census town, R: rural/ urban centre, H: historical/ religious centre
Owing to space constraints in the small map, the actual locations in a larger map may vary slightly

=== Location ===
Silda is surrounded by Jambani Block towards south, Binpur-I Block towards east, Jhargram Block towards south, Sarenga Block towards north. Pin code of silda is 721515.

=== Area overview ===
Jhargram subdivision, the only one in Jhargram district, shown in the map alongside, is composed of hills, mounds and rolling lands. It is rather succinctly described in the District Human Development Report, 2011 (at that time it was part of Paschim Medinipur district), “The western boundary is more broken and picturesque, for the lower ranges of the Chhotanagpur Hills line the horizon, the jungle assumes the character of forest, and large trees begin to predominate. The soil, however, is lateritic, a considerable area is unproductive, almost uninhabited, especially in the extreme north-west where there are several hills over 1000 feet in height. The remainder of the country is an almost level plain broken only by the sand hills.” 3.48% of the population lives in urban areas and 96.52% lives in the rural areas. 20.11% of the total population belonged to scheduled castes and 29.37% belonged to scheduled tribes.

Note: The map alongside presents some of the notable locations in the subdivision. All places marked in the map are linked in the larger full screen map.

== Demographics ==
According to the 2011 Census of India, Shilda had a total population of 5,724, of which 2,861 (50%) were males and 2,863 (50%) were females. There were 540 persons in the age range of 0–6 years. The total number of literate persons in Shilda was 4,218 (81.37% of the population over 6 years).

== Infrastructure ==
According to the District Census Handbook 2011, Paschim Medinipur, Shilda covered an area of 1.3776 km^{2}. Among the civic amenities, it had 3 km roads with open drains, the protected water supply involved overhead tank, service reservoir, tap water from treated and untreated sources. It had 503 domestic electric connections. Among the medical facilities it had 7 medicine shops in the town, the nearest dispensary/ health centre being 4 km away . Among the educational facilities it had were 2 primary schools, 2 senior secondary school, 1 general degree college. It had 1 recognised shorthand, typewriting and vocational training institution. Among the social cultural and recreational facilities, it had 2 working women’s hostels, 1 cinema theatre, 1 auditorium/ community hall, 1 public library, 1 reading room. Three important commodities it produced were rice, stone chip, saw mill. It had the branch offices of 1 nationalised bank, 1 cooperative bank, 1 agricultural credit society and 2 non-agricultural credit societies.

== Transport ==
State Highway 9 running from Durgapur (in Paschim Bardhaman district) to Nayagram (in Jhargram district) and State Highway 5 running from Rupnarayanpur (in Paschim Bardhaman district) to Junput (in Purba Medinipur) pass through Silda.

== Education ==
Silda Chandra Sekhar College was established in 1971 at Silda. It is affiliated to Vidyasagar University. It offers courses in Bengali, Santali, English, Sanskrit, History, Political Science, Commerce, Physics, Chemistry and Mathematics.

== Healthcare ==
Silda Primary Health Centre entrance

There is a primary health centre at Silda, with 6 beds.

== Culture ==
Bhairav Than about two km north of Silda Town is an ancient Temple. Here God Shiva is worshipped as Baba Bhairav. A Gramin Mela is held every year on the occasion of Durga Puja: Bijoya Dashami. The people of Jharkhand, Bihar, also gathered here.

== See also ==
- Belpahari
