= Jhargram district =

District in West Bengal, India

- District of West Bengal
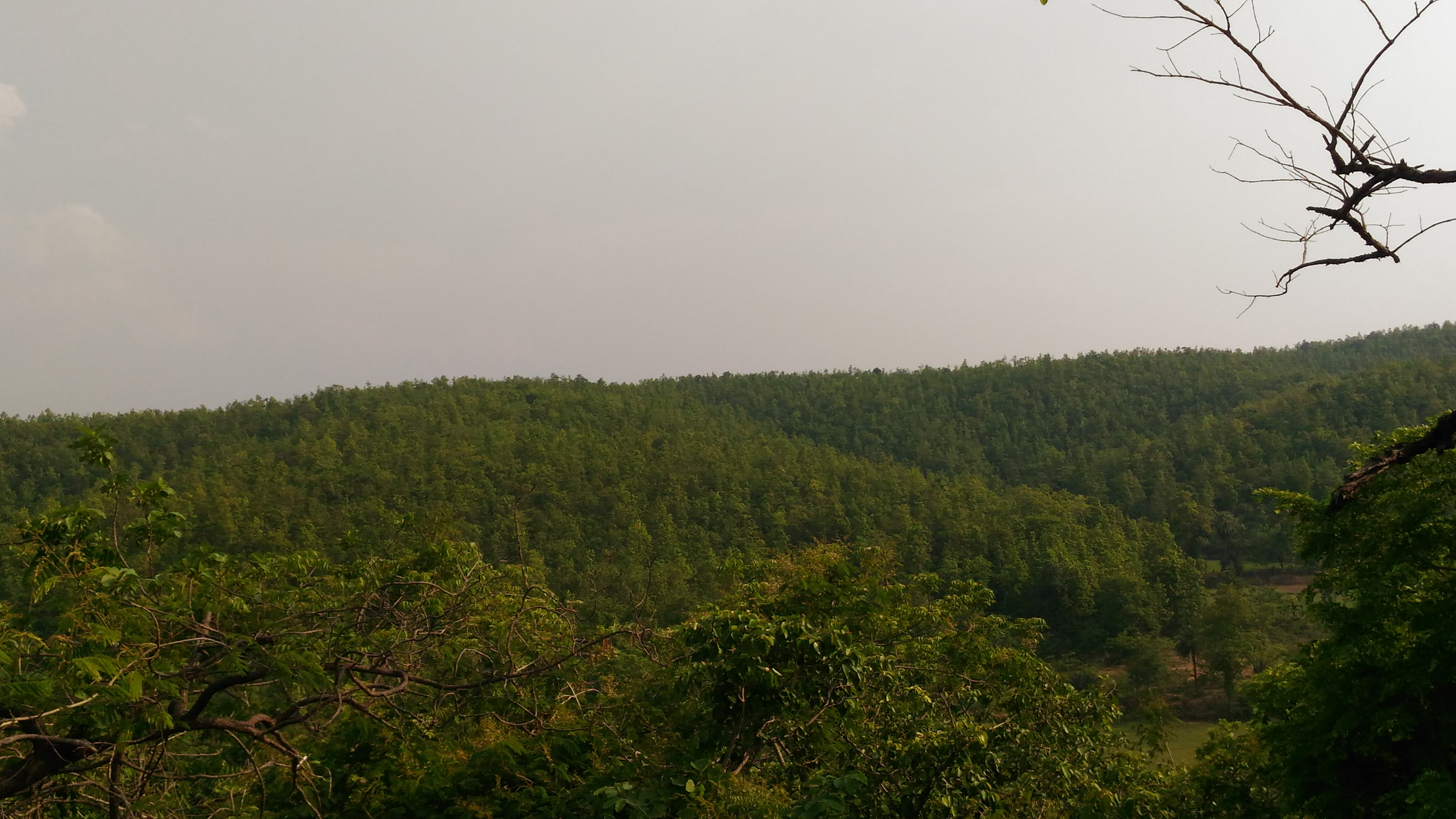
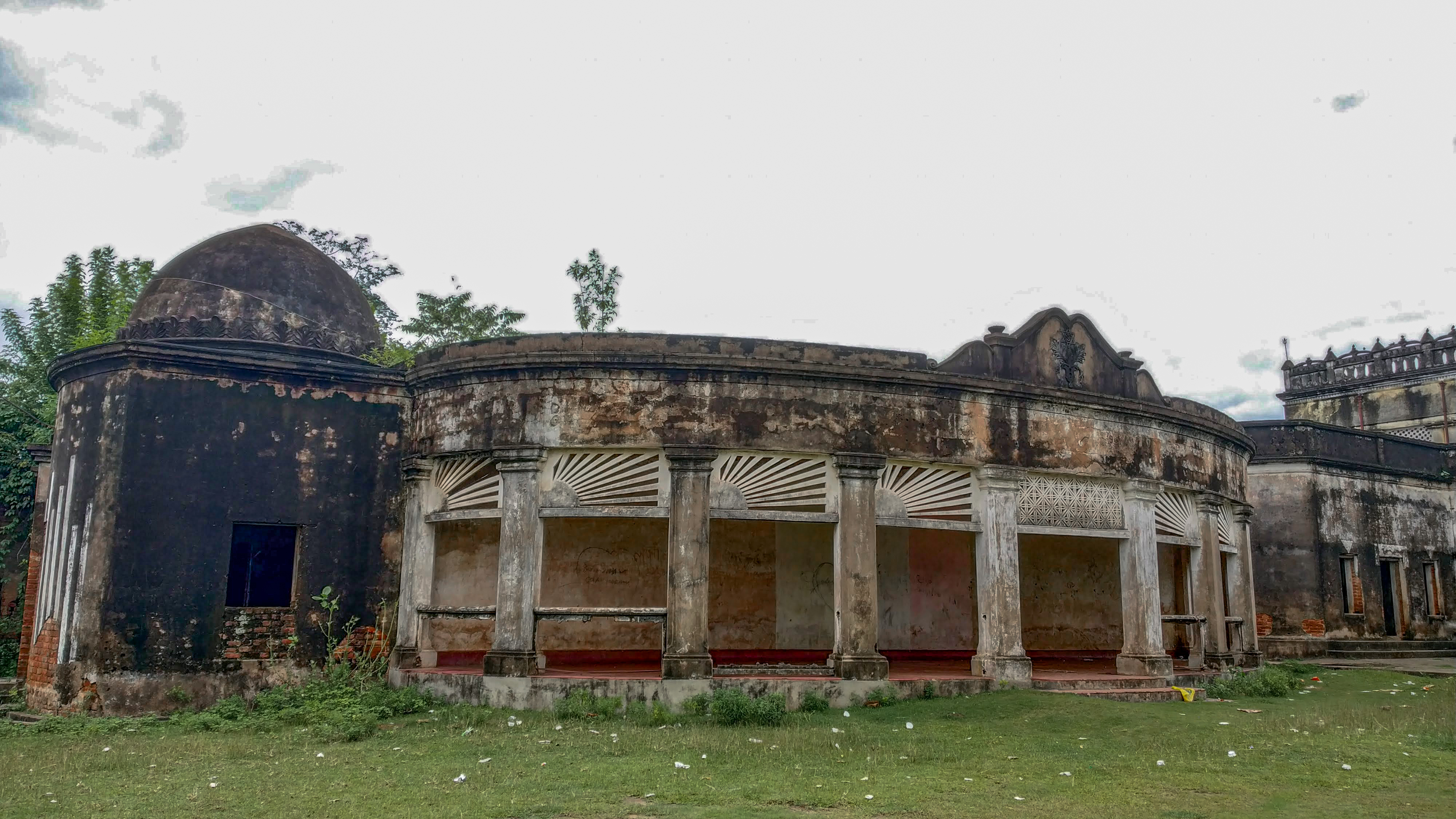
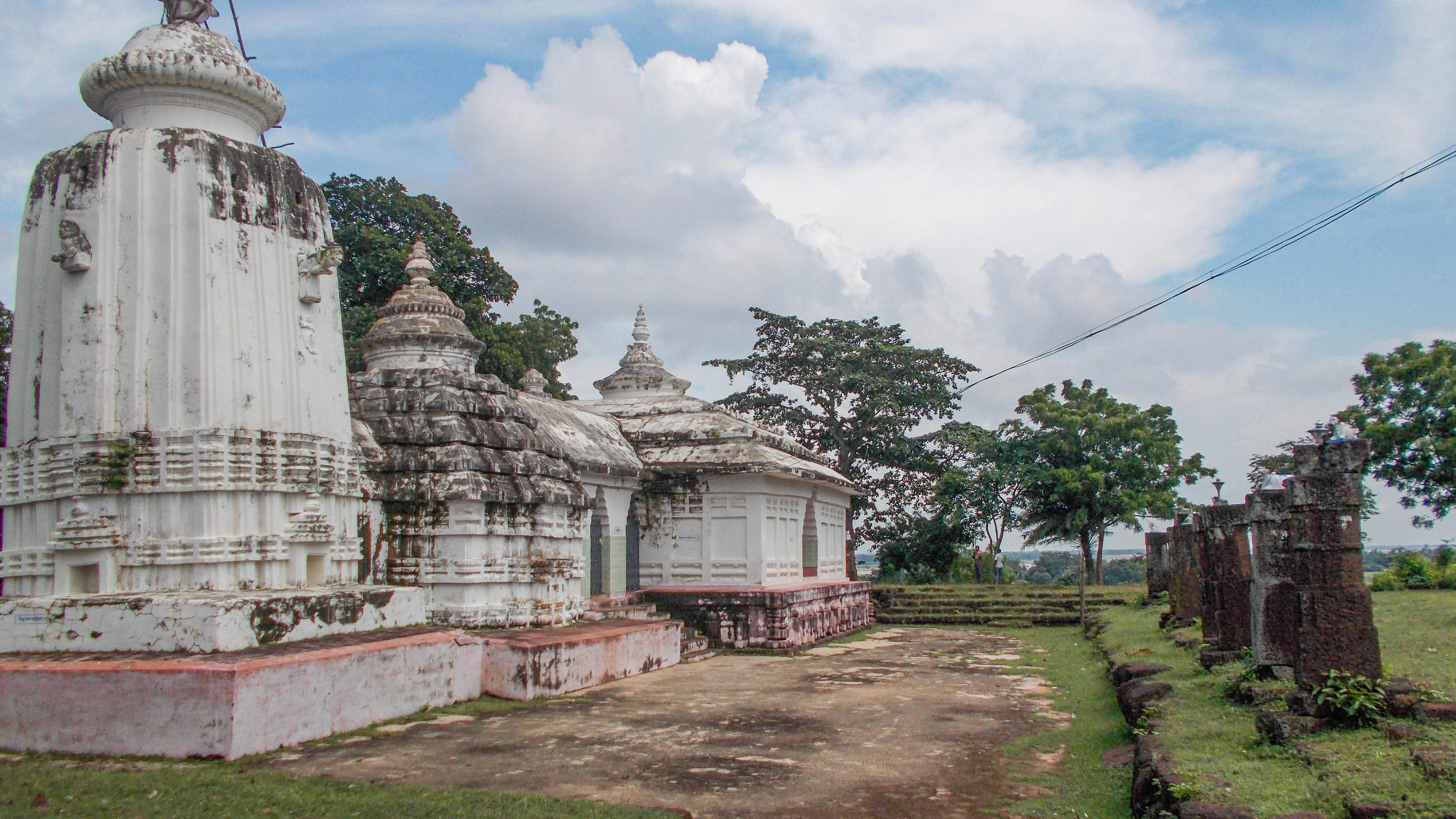
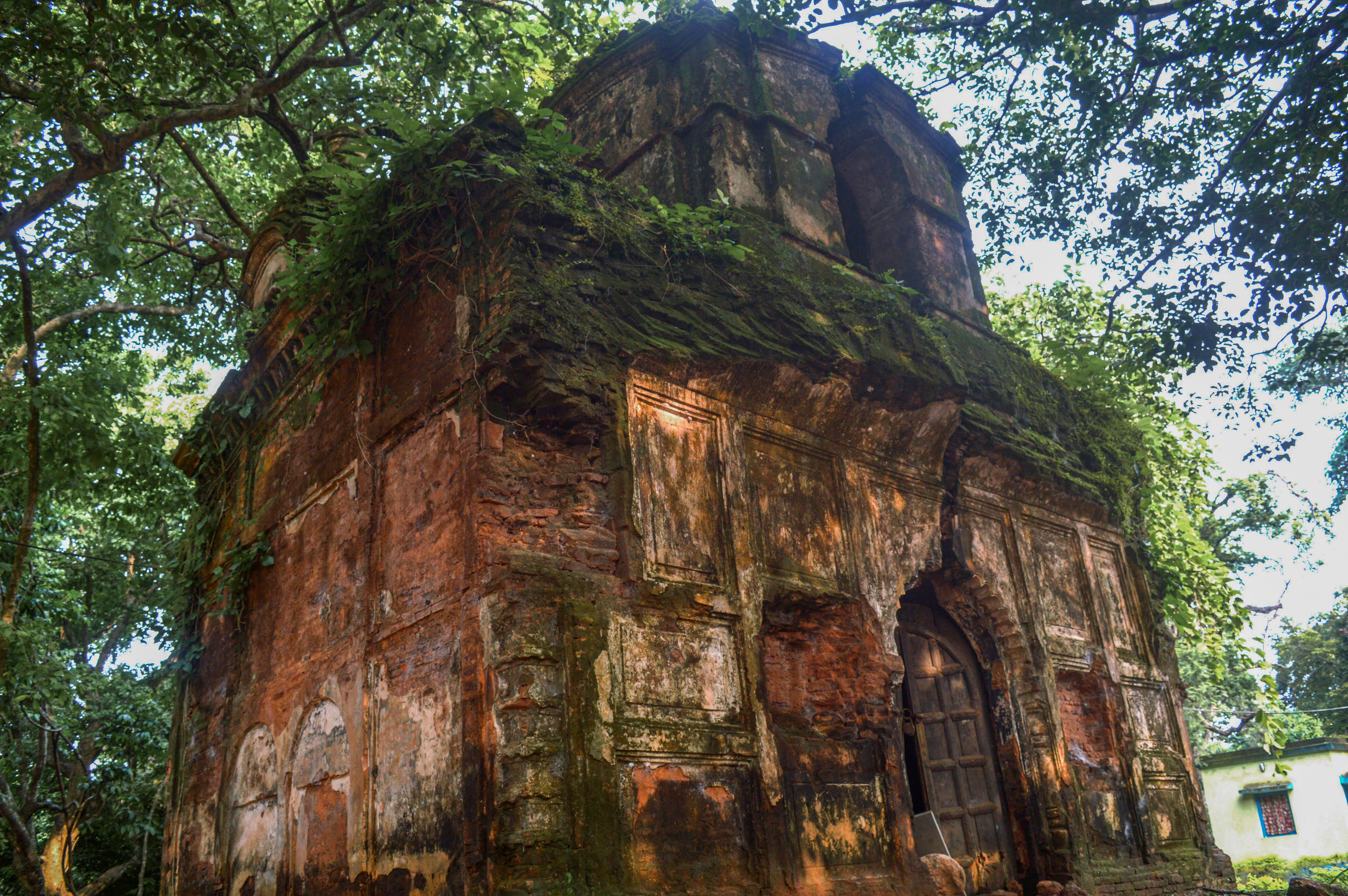
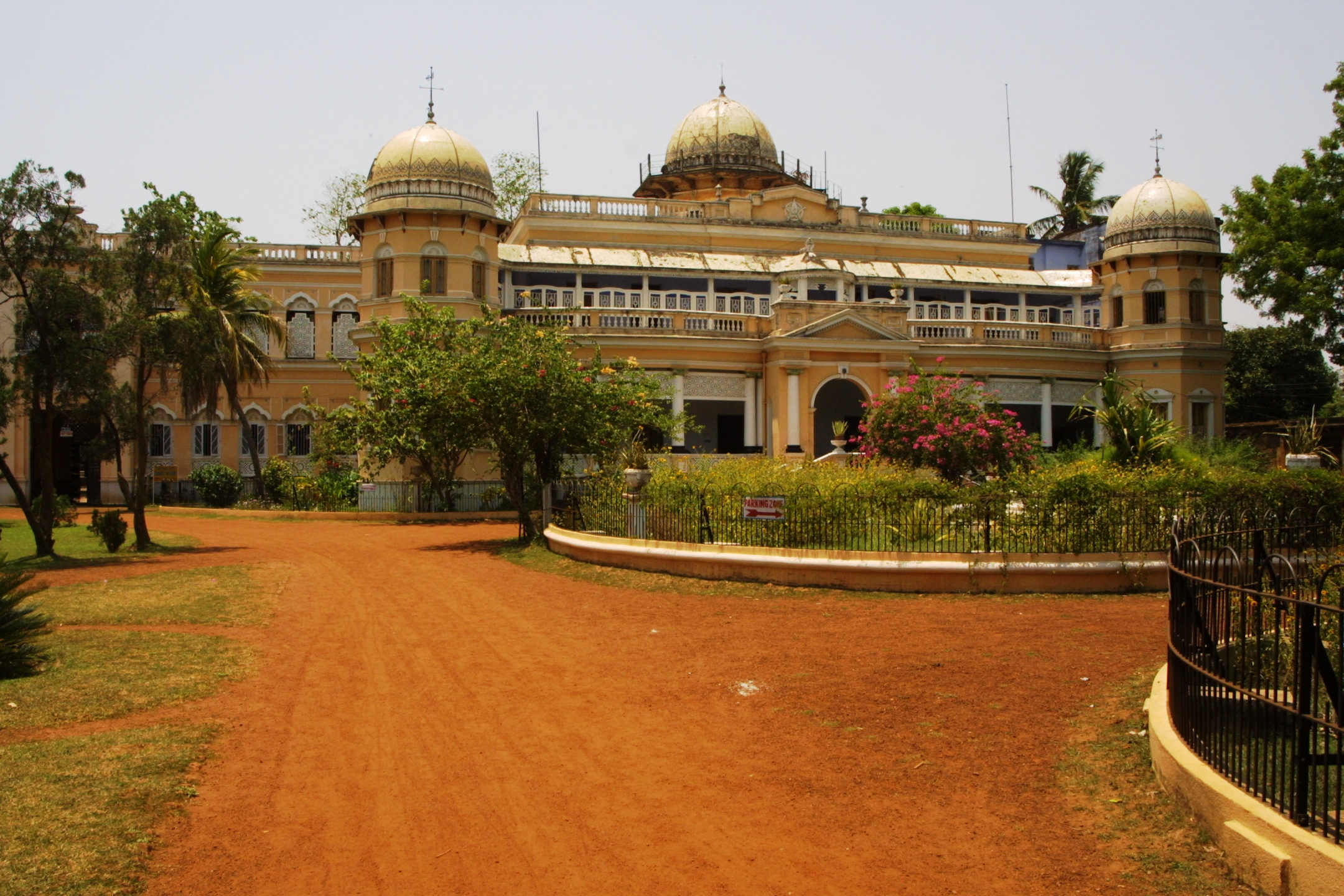
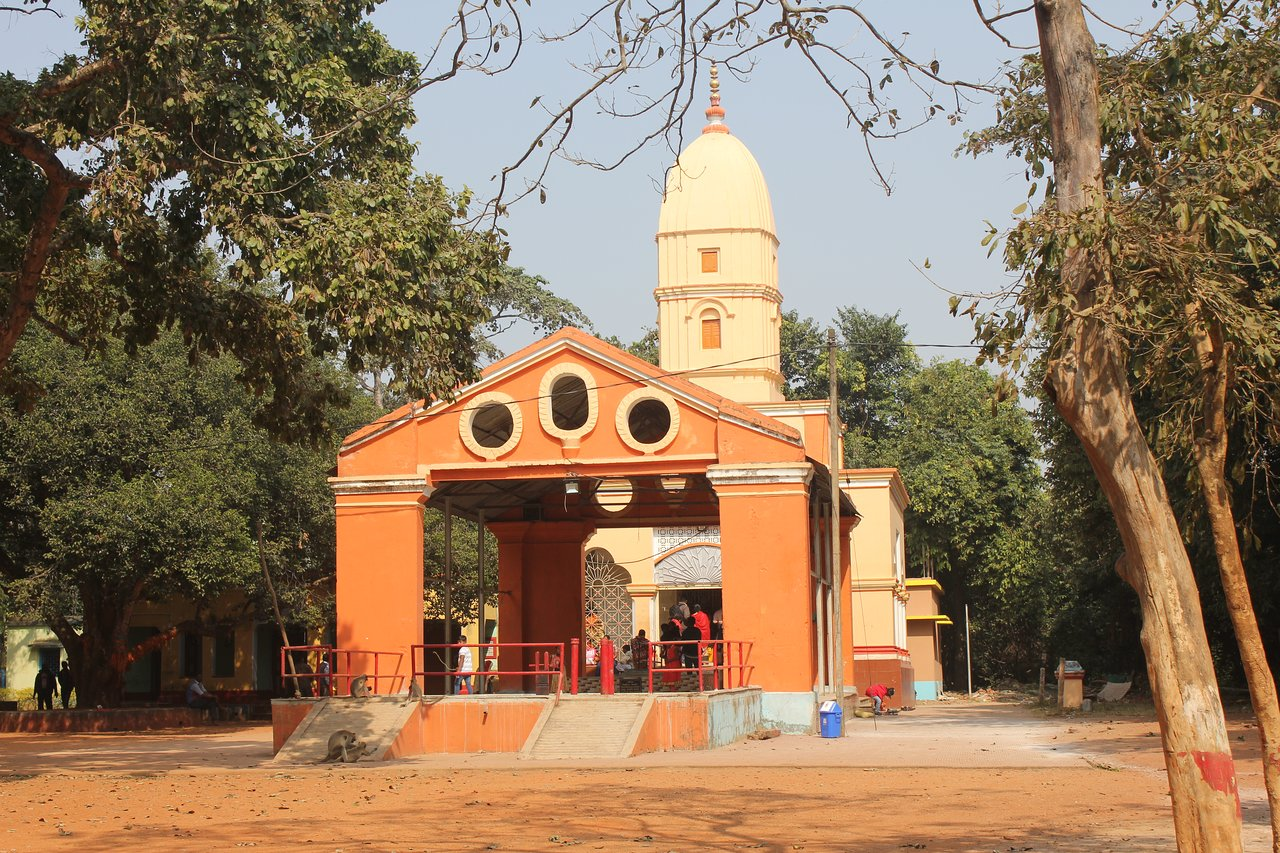
- Clockwise from top: View from the top of Belpahari, Rameshwar Temple, Jhargram Palace, Kanak Durga Temple, Chilkigarh Rajbari

- Location of Jhargram district in West Bengal
- Coordinates: 22.45°N 86.98°E
- Country: India
- State: West Bengal
- Division: Medinipur division
- Headquarters: Jhargram

Government
  - Subdivisions: Jhargram Sadar
  - CD Blocks: Jhargram, Jamboni, Binpur I, Binpur II, Gopiballavpur I, Gopiballavpur II, Sankrail, Nayagram
  - Lok Sabha constituencies: Jhargram
  - Vidhan Sabha constituencies: Jhargram, Gopiballavpur, Nayagram, Binpur

Area
  - Total: 3,037.90 km^{2} (1,172.94 sq mi)

Population (2011)
  - Total: 1,136,548
  - Density: 374.123/km^{2} (968.974/sq mi)
  - Urban: 61,712

Demographics
  - Literacy: 89.2 per cent
  - Sex ratio: 949 ♂/♀

Languages
  - Official: Santali, Bengali
  - Additional official: English
- Time zone: UTC+05:30 (IST)
- Website: jhargram.gov.in

Jhargram is a district in the state of West Bengal, India.The district lies between the Kangsabati River in the north and the Subarnarekha in the south. Jhargram has one of the lowest population densities among the districts of West Bengal, with almost all its population living in rural areas. It is a popular tourist destination known for its sal forests, elephants, ancient temples and royal palaces. The district was formed on 4 April 2017, after bifurcation from the Paschim Medinipur district as the 22nd district of West Bengal. The district has its headquarters at Jhargram.

== History ==
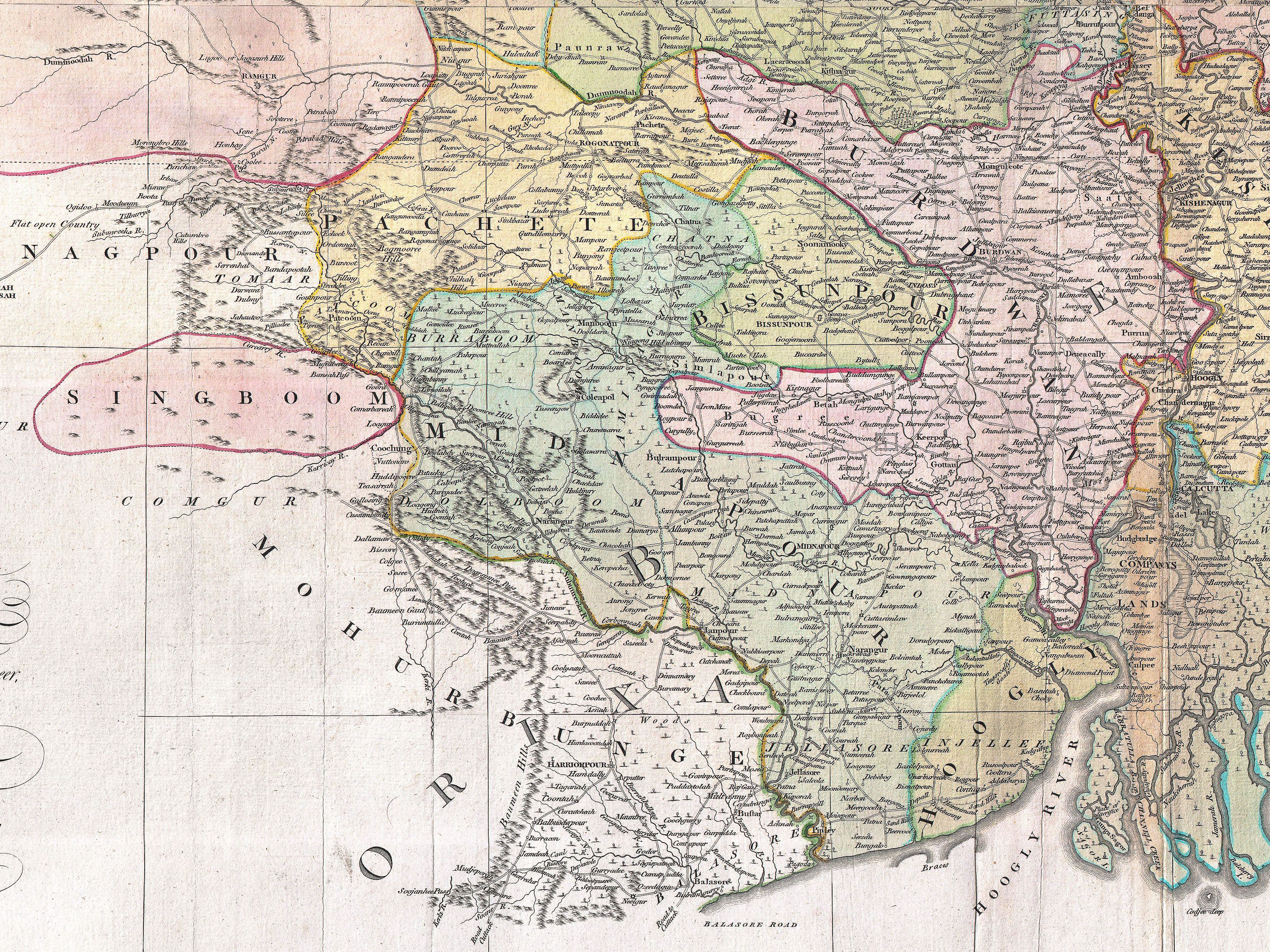
James Rennell's 1776 map showing surrounding areas of present-day Jhargram district

In southwest Bengal (including the forests of erstwhile West Midnapore Division), the history of forest and its management can be traced to the 16th century, when forests were free for use by local villagers for household purposes and cleaning for cultivation. During the Mughal period, under the land revenue system introduced by Todar Mal, local zamindars had to pay "Ruba", a quarter-share of revenue to the Mughal Emperors for their protection. In 1773, the East India Company went for the permanent settlement of forests (and the landed properties) with zamindars as proprietor. In 1890 to 1905, Bengal-Nagpur Railways opened railway lines, which helped the cheaper transport of forest produces to faraway places with ease and less cost. That was followed by two world wars, which took a heavy toll of forest resources.

The forests of the division were included in Jungle Mahal which was held by zamindars (local chiefs), who maintained their respective forests in a feudal tenure system. With the coming up of Bengal-Nagpur Railway lines from Kharagpur to Jamshedpur via Jhargram, the forests of the area became accessible. The forests came to be recognised as a source of earning more return for the zamindars. Most forests of the division were owned by the Nawab of Murshidabad, the MahaRaja of Mayurbhanj, the Raja of Jhargram, the Raja of Chilkigarh, zamindar of Rohini Garh, Raja of Nayagram and the Midnapore Zamindar Company. The forests were in an advanced stage of degradation because of ruthless exploitation by the zamindars on a rotation period of 4–5 years. The mismanagement of the forests continued until 1948, when the government of West Bengal started exercising control over the management of forests under the West Bengal Private Forests Act, 1948, but the situation was little improved.

In 1953, the Estates Acquisition Act came into force, and the forests, which had been long owned by private owners, have been vested to the government since 1954 or 1955. They became free from all encumbrances for scientific management and control. Subsequently, they became owned by the Forest Department, which gradually depended upon the availability of records, evidence, and court orders.

After the state took over the forests, they were brought under scientific management. However, the productivity of the forests had gone down to such a level that they could not meet the growing demands of forest produces from the ever-increasing population of fringe areas and the county as a whole. The problem was further multiplied by the growing unemployment in the forest fringe villagers and lack of enough resources in the rural areas to end the situation.

Administrative measures and policing efforts to thwart the biotic pressures on the forests resulted only in more conflicts and led to complete alienation of the fringe population from the administration. The protection of the forests became hazardous. The administration had almost failed to tackle the situation and was looking for a solution.

A pilot project was launched in 1971-1972 by the Divisional Forest Officer, Silviculture (South) Division at Arabari of East Midnapore Division. Its objective was to involve the people living on the fringes of forests in protecting forest resources by the improvement of their socioeconomic conditions.

In 1985-1986, the pilot project was reviewed, evaluated and analyzed. The entire project area had apparently been restocked with nearly 700 ha of sal coppice forests and 300 ha of plantation crops. In fact, the pilot project had proved to be a success.

That formula of involvement of the indigenous people in forest protection and management has been repeated in other areas including West Midnapore Division since the mid-1980s very successfully. The state gave recognition to the system of management of forests, popularly termed as Joint Forest Management, by issuing an order in 1989 and amendments in 1990 and 1991. The division has 480 Forest Protection Committees. Since 1 April 2006, the West Midnapore Division has been reorganized and been renamed as Jhargram Forest Division. Chandabila, Nayagram, and Kesorekha Ranges have been transferred to Kharagpur Division with all establishments. Therefore, the area of Jhargram Division is now about 620 km^{2}.

== Geography ==
Jhargram district covers an area of 3037.64 Sq. km. Out of which 268249 hectare is agricultural land and 59497 hectare is under forest coverage. The district is a part of Chota Nagpur Plateau which gradually slopes down towards east, hilly terrain occurs in the north-western part of the district. Kakrajhore area is having the highest altitude of about 300 metres. This area is covered with unfertile hard laterite soil/rocks. The altitude of southern areas of the district belonging to Nayagram, Gopiballavpur-I & II blocks are having the altitude of about 65 mts, the soil is comparatively alluvial in these areas. The altitude of Jhargram town is around 80 mts.

=== Rainfall ===
The average annual rainfall of Jhargram (Jhargram Forest Division) is about 1400 mm. The rainy season spreads over June to September due to southwest monsoon and the highest rainfall occurs in July and August. The rainfall starts decreasing from October and dry winter sets in. The dry season lasts until May. However, during this time this division gets some sporadic showers.

Climate data for Jhargram, India
| Month | Jan | Feb | Mar | Apr | May | Jun | Jul | Aug | Sep | Oct | Nov | Dec | Year |
|---|---|---|---|---|---|---|---|---|---|---|---|---|---|
| Mean daily maximum °C (°F) | 16 (61) | 21 (70) | 32 (90) | 38 (100) | 39 (102) | 36 (97) | 30 (86) | 30 (86) | 30 (86) | 31 (88) | 19 (66) | 17 (63) | 30 (86) |
| Mean daily minimum °C (°F) | 5 (41) | 10 (50) | 21 (70) | 25 (77) | 27 (81) | 27 (81) | 23 (73) | 23 (73) | 22 (72) | 21 (70) | 7 (45) | 6 (43) | 22 (72) |
| Average precipitation mm (inches) | 9.8 (0.39) | 8.3 (0.33) | 19.4 (0.76) | 57.7 (2.27) | 74.9 (2.95) | 172.8 (6.80) | 334.9 (13.19) | 332.7 (13.10) | 185.8 (7.31) | 104.5 (4.11) | 8.7 (0.34) | 5.9 (0.23) | 1,007.4 (39.66) |
Source: Weatherbase

=== Forests ===
For scientific management of forests vested in Government under Estate Acquisition Act, 1953, Jhargram Forest under the administrative setup as Jhargram Division erstwhile parent division styled as Midnapur Division was bifurcated into two divisions viz. West Midnapur Division (renamed as Jhargram Division ) with headquarters at Jhargram and East Midnapur Division with headquarters at Midnapur. The West Midnapore Division came into existence on 29.01.1954. It has mainly dry Sal forests with very less under growth due to excessive underground fires and over grazing. As on 01.04.2021, there are 4 Forest divisions in Jhargram district Viz. Jhargram(70% of total district covering both Forest and non forest areas), Kharagpur(25%), Midnapore(3%) and Rupnanrayan(2%) divisions. Forest divisions also work in non forest areas for prevention of Forest offences, management of wildlife such as migration of elephants, felling permission and issuance of transit passes for trees felled outside the forest areas, development of community infrastructure for people dependent on Forests, disaster management works, etc.

=== Rivers ===
The important rivers of this division are the Kangsabati (popularly known as Kasai), the Tarafeni, the Subarnarekha, and the Dulong [also known as 'Dulung']. Apart from the above rivers, there are several rivulets viz. 'Deb', 'Palpala', Rangium', 'Kupon' etc. Most of the above rivers flow from west to east as the Western side of the division is having higher altitude.

The Kangsabati river

This river enters the division on the north from Bankura district and flows along a tortuous course running to the south and southwest direction and then flows towards east keeping the Midnapore town on the left (north). The river has contracted rapidly below Midnapore and at Kapastikri (about 20 km down below from Midnapore) the river has bifurcated. One course has gone towards the north and finally has drained into the Rupnarayan river while the other course has run towards the south-east and finally has fallen into the Haldi river.

The Tarafeni river

This river originates in the northwest portion of this division near Patagarh in Banspahari Range. It runs towards east within the jurisdiction of Belpahari and Binpur police Stations and finally has fallen into the Kangsabati river.

The Subarnarekha river

This river enters the division on the west from Dhalbhum (Jharkhand State) and passes through the south of the division intersecting the Gopiballavpur Police Station and forming the northern boundary of Nayagram Police Station (Kharagpur Division). On the south of Dantan, it enters the Balasore district of Odisha and finally falls into the Bay of Bengal. The Subarnarekha has a rapid stream with a sandy bed, and its banks are generally high and well defined. In the season of high flood, the river overflows its left bank about 6 km above the point where it leaves Paschim Midnapore district to enter the Balasore district.

The Dulong [Dulung] river

It is the main tributary of the Subarnarekha. It originates in the northwest portion of the division near Dulungdiha (J.L.No. 100, P.S.: Binpur) and runs generally in a southern direction near the western boundary of the division till it enters Jamboni Police Station. While passing through this police station from north to south it is joined by the Kupon river, Banshir Khal, Polpala Khal, Deb river and Putrangi Khal. Thereafter, it enters Gopiballavpur Police Station where its general direction is from west to east and then Sankrail police station where it again runs in a southerly direction and joins the Subarnarekha.

== Administration ==
Jhargram district has 10 police stations, 8 community development blocks, 8 panchayat samitis, 79 gram panchayats, Lodhashuli Gram Panchayat one of them, 2,996 mouzas, 2513 inhabited villages, 1 municipality and 1 census town. The single municipality is at Jhargram. The census town is Shilda: The only subdivision, Jhargram subdivision, has its headquarters at Jhargram. The state Cabinet has given its nod to form 2 more sub-divisions. The three sub-divisions are supposed to be headquartered at Belpahari, Gopiballavpur and Jhargram.

The 8 community development blocks are:

- Jhargram
- Jamboni
- Binpur-I
- Binpur-II
- Gopiballavpur-I
- Gopiballvapur-II
- Sankrail
- Nayagram

=== Location ===
Presently the forests of Jhargram Division are situated in the Civil Sub-division of Jhargram of Jhargram District and cover the Civil Blocks viz. Binpur-I (the portion on the West of the Kangsabati river), Binpur-II, Jhargram, Jamboni, Gopiballavpur-I & Gopiballavpur-II and police stations of Belpahari, Binpur, Jamboni, Jhargram, Gopiballavpurand Beliyabera. The Jhargram Forest Division lies between 21°-52' and 22°-48' North latitudes and 86°-34' and 87°-20' East longitude approximately. On the North, it is bordered by the civil districts of Purulia and Bankura and on the East, it is bordered by the river Kangsabati (from the western border of Midnapore Division) and partly by the river Subarnarekha from the western border of Kharagpur Division. Jharkhand shares a border with the State of Orissa in the South and in the West with the Jharkhand State.

The headquarters of this division is Jhargram which is around 15 km away from the AH46 (previously known as National Highway-6) and is situated on the Kolkata-Bombay main line of the South-Eastern Railway. The city is also the headquarters of Jhargram District. The distance of Jhargram from Kolkata is approximately 170 km.

== Demographics ==
Historical population
| Year | Pop. | ±% |
|---|---|---|
| 1881 | 290,414 | — |
| 1891 | 325,508 | +12.1% |
| 1901 | 360,282 | +10.7% |
| 1911 | 366,627 | +1.8% |
| 1921 | 350,134 | −4.5% |
| 1931 | 389,130 | +11.1% |
| 1941 | 426,245 | +9.5% |
| 1951 | 461,730 | +8.3% |
Source: Census of India

Jhargram district had a population of 1,136,548, of which 67,436 (5.93%) live in urban areas. Jhargram district has a sex ratio of 977 females per 1000 males. Scheduled Castes and Scheduled Tribes made up 235,506 (20.11%) and 333,848 (29.37%) of the total population respectively.

=== Religion ===
Religion in Jhargram district (2011)
| Hinduism | 86.60% |
| Sarnaism | 9.83% |
| Islam | 2.46% |
| Christianity | 0.45% |
| Other or not stated | 0.66% |

=== Language ===
Languages of Jhargram district (2011)
1. Bengali (78.2%)
2. Santali (18.7%)
3. Mundari (1.45%)
4. Kurmali (1.16%)
5. Others (1.48%)

At the time of the 2011 census, 78.23% of the population spoke Bengali, 18.68% Santali, 1.45% Mundari and 1.16% Kurmali as their first language.

== Economy ==
The main economy of this area is business & cultivation. Some people are government employees, School Teachers and employed in other private sectors. There are many textile and agriculture based industries. Tourism is also one of the important factors for the economy of this district.

== Education ==
=== University ===
- Sadhu Ram Chand Murmu University

=== General degree colleges ===
- Jhargram Raj College (Govt. College) under Vidyasagar University
- Jhargram Raj College Girls Wing's (Govt. College) under Vidyasagar University
- Sankrail Anil Biswas Smriti Mahavidyalaya
- Seva Bharati Mahavidyalaya
- Silda Chandra Sekhar College
- Subarnarekha Mahavidyalaya
- Lalgarh Government College
- Vivekananda Satavarshiki Mahavidyalaya

=== Technical and Medical Colleges ===
- Jhargram Government Medical College and Hospital
- Ishwar Chandra Vidyasagar Polytechnic
- Raja Ranajit Kishore Government Polytechnic

=== High Schools ===
- Jhargram Ashok Vidyapith (H.S)
- Jhargram Banitirtha High School
- Jhargram Kumud Kumari Institution
- Jhargram Nanibala Balika Vidyalaya
- Jhargram Nanibala Boys School
- Sri Ramkrishna Saradapith Girls High School
- Rani Binode Manjari Govt. Girls High School
- Rohini Chowdhurani Rukmini Devi High School(H.S)

== Culture ==
Jhargram is home to many dances such as Chuang, Chang, Chhau, Dangrey, Jhumur, Panta, Ranpa, Saharul, Tusu & Bhadu.

Besides the culture, the regular Bengali festivals like Durga puja, Saraswati puja, Diwali and Kali pujas are well attended. Other common pujas in the worship of Shitala, Jagaddhatri, Dol Purnima, Ratha Yatra, Janmashtami, Bhima Puja, etc. also takes place.

A lot of fairs and carnivals take place in Jhargram. The famous fairs in Jhargram are Jungle Mahal Utsav, Jhargram Mela & Yuva Utsav, Rong Maati Manush, Shrabani Mela, Baishakhi Mela, Milan Mela, boi mela, silpithirtha, dog show, sramik mela, sabala mela.

== Tourist attractions ==
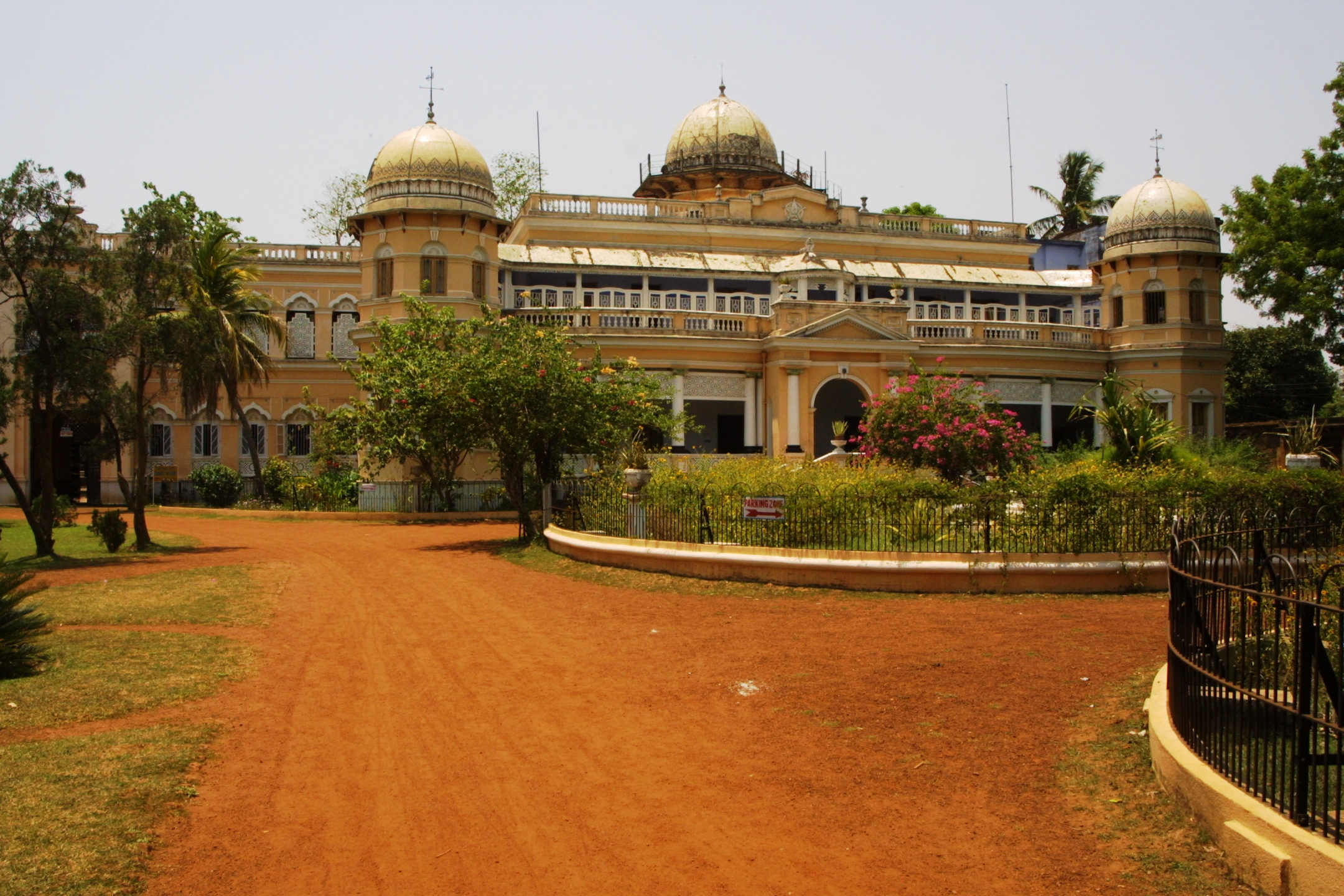
Jhargram Palace

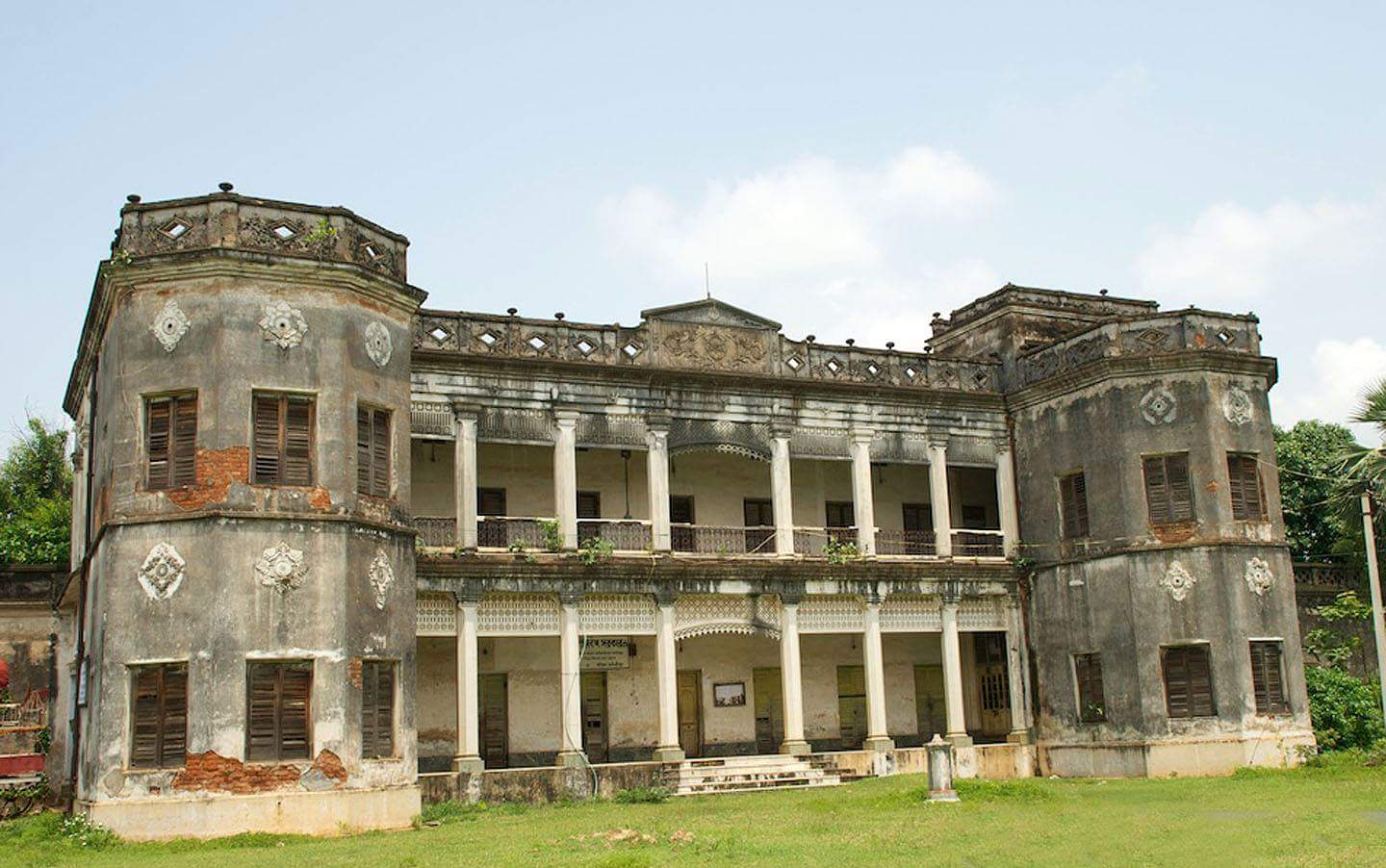
Chilkigarh Rajbari, Chilkigarh

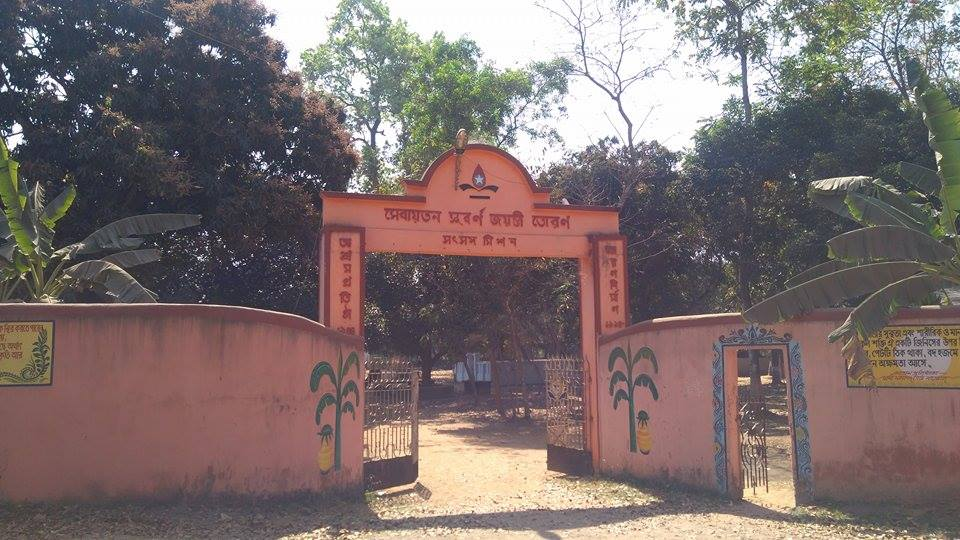
Sebayatan Satsanga Mission, Jhargram

There are several tourist-attracting places throughout the Sub-Division.

- Jhargram Palace
- Chilkigarh Rajbari, Chilkigarh
- Deer Park (Jungle Mahal Zoological Park)
- Savitri Temple
- Rabindra Park
- Sitala Mandir, Chandipur
- Chilkigarh Raj Palace
- Kanak Durga Temple
- Rohini Garh Zamidar Bari(The Rohini Garh Palace,Rohini
- Rameswar Temple
- Jungle Mahal
- Medical Plants Garden (Kalaboni)
- Dherua (in the banks of Kansai river)
- Sevayatan is known for Kechenda Bandh (lake) & surrounding forests
- Tribal Museum
- Kakrajhore Forest
- Rohini, birthplace of famous Vaishnav saint Rashikanandaji Maharaj
- Gidhni
- Dholkat Pukuria
- Hatibari Forest Bungalow
- Jhilli Pakhiraloy
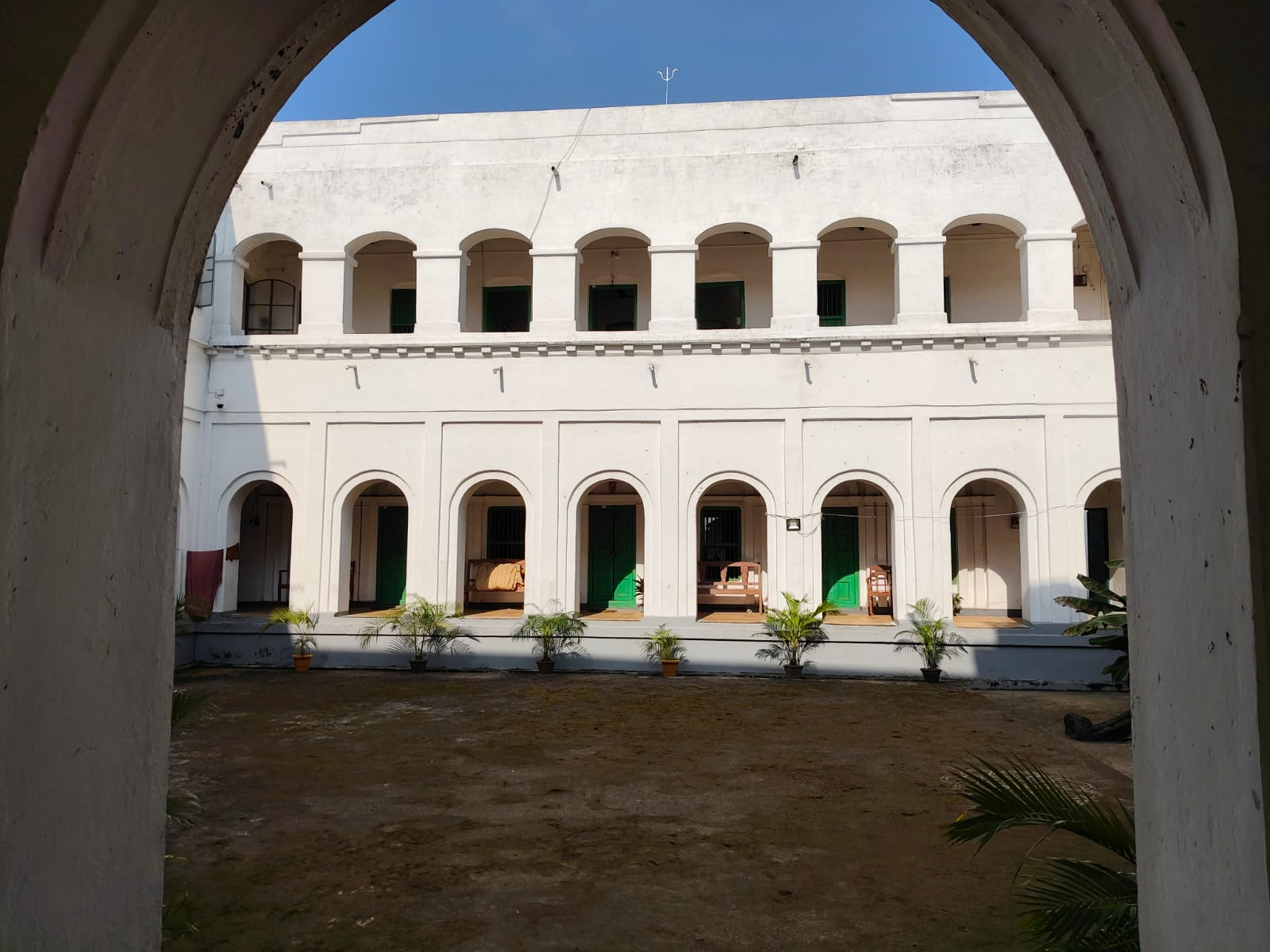
  The Rohini Garh Palace
- Gopiballavpur Eco Park
- Ghagra Water Falls, Belpahari

== Transportation ==
=== Air ===
The nearest operational airport is Netaji Subhash Chandra Bose International Airport of Kolkata 155 km (by train) and 169 km (by road- NH-6).Sonari Airport of Jamshedpur is located at a distance 96 km by train. Birsa Munda Airport of Ranchi is located at a distance of 233 km (by road- NH-33) and 258 km (by train).

=== Train ===
Jhargram is connected not only to larger cities in the region, but also to smaller towns and villages in the district. Jhargram Railway Station is on the Kharagpur-Tatanagar section of Howrah-Nagpur-Mumbai line, an express train route. The Jhargram railway station comes under South Eastern Railway. Jhargram is well connected by train to nearest big city like Kolkata/Howrah (155 km), Kharagpur (39 km), Asansol, Tatanagar (96 km), Ranchi, Dhanbad, Rourkela, Jharsuguda, Bhubaneswar, Cuttack, Puri, Bhilai and also Delhi and Mumbai.

=== Road ===
Jhargram is also very well connected by highways it lies on AH46 which is a part of the Asian Highway Network and also with other nearby cities like Medinipur (40 km over Dherua - Medinipur Road), Kharagpur (46 km over NH-6), Durgapur (156 km over SH-9), Asansol (181 km over NH-60 and SH-9), Bankura (114 km over SH-9 and 5), Purulia (142 km over SH-5), Haldia (150 km over AH46 and NH41), Contai (144 km over SH-5), Digha (165 km over NH-60), Kolkata/Howrah (169 km over AH46), Tatanagar (114 km over NH-33), Baripada (99 km over AH46 and NH-5), etc.

== Politics ==
Jhargram district consists of four assembly constituencies: Nayagram (ST), Gopiballavpur, Jhargram, and Binpur (ST). All four are part of the Jhargram (ST) Lok Sabha constituency.

| No. | Name | Lok Sabha | MLA | 2026 Winner | 2024 Lead |
|---|---|---|---|---|---|
| 1 | Nayagram (ST) | Jhargram | Amiya Kisku | Bharatiya Janata Party | Trinamool Congress |
| 2 | Gopiballavpur | Jhargram | Rajesh Mahata | Bharatiya Janata Party | Trinamool Congress |
| 3 | Jhargram | Jhargram | Lakshmi Kanta Sau | Bharatiya Janata Party | Trinamool Congress |
| 4 | Binpur (ST) | Jhargram | Pranat Tudu | Bharatiya Janata Party | Trinamool Congress |
