= Medinipur Lok Sabha constituency =

Lok Sabha constituency in West Bengal

Coordinates: 22.4°N 87.3°E

Medinipur WB-34
- Lok Sabha constituency
- Interactive Map Outlining Medinipur Lok Sabha Constituency

Constituency details
- Country: India
- Region: East India
- State: West Bengal
- Assembly constituencies: Egra; Dantan; Keshiary; Kharagpur Sadar; Narayangarh; Kharagpur; Medinipur
- Established: 1951
- Total electors: 18,11,243
- Reservation: None

Member of Parliament
- 18th Lok Sabha
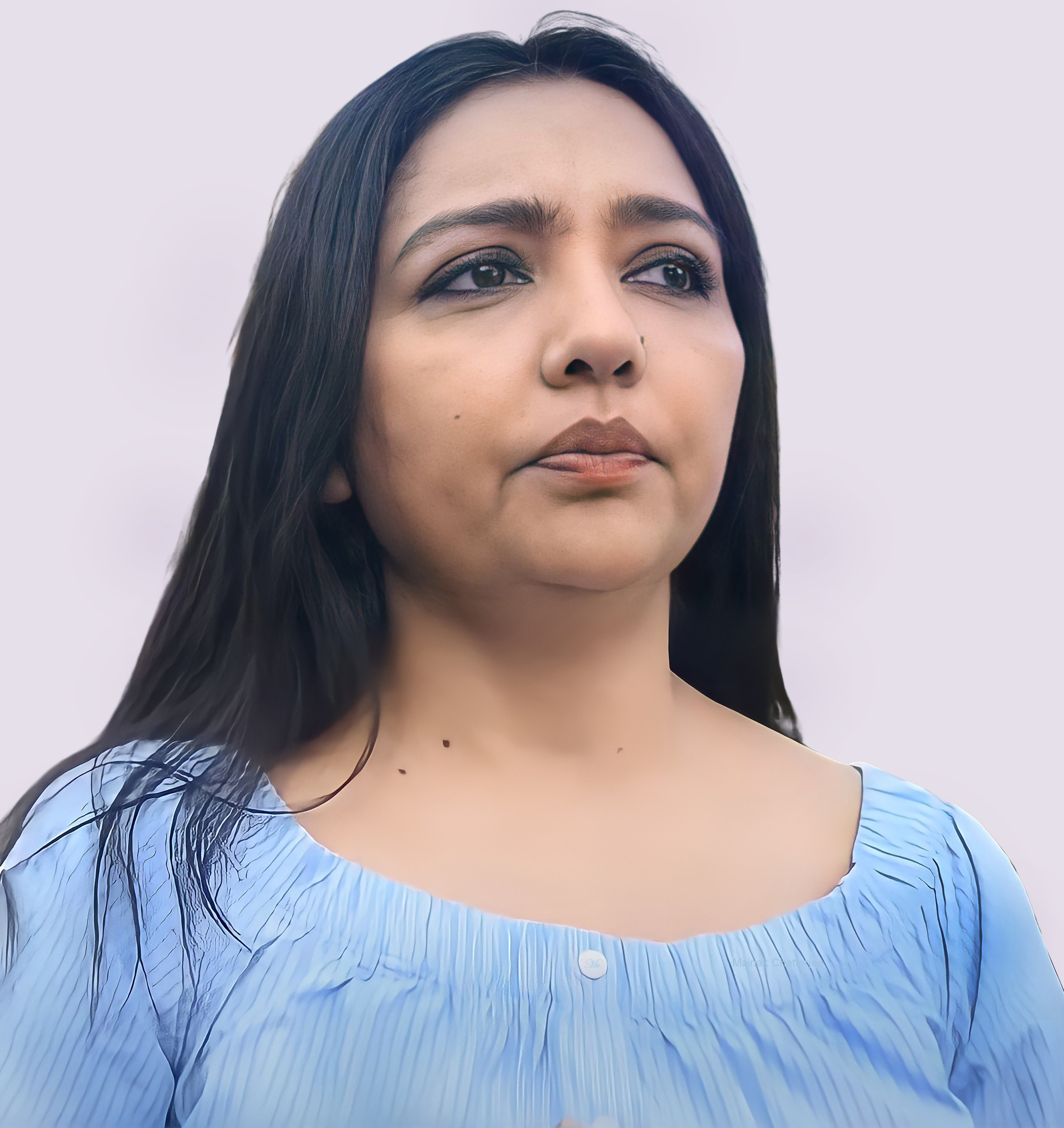
- Incumbent June Malia
- Party: NCPI
- Alliance: NDA
- Elected year: 2024

Medinipur Lok Sabha constituency (formerly, Midnapore Lok Sabha constituency) is one of the 543 parliamentary constituencies in India. The constituency centres on Midnapore in West Bengal. Six of the seven assembly segments of No. 34 Medinipur Lok Sabha constituency are in Paschim Medinipur district and one is in Purba Medinipur district.

== Assembly segments ==
Parliamentary constituencies in West Bengal - 1. Cooch Behar, 2. Alipurduars, 3. Jalpaiguri, 4. Darjeeling, 5. Raiganj, 6. Balurghat, 7. Maldaha Uttar, 8. Maldaha Dakshin, 9. Jangipur, 10. Baharampur, 11. Murshidabad, 12. Krishnanagar, 13. Ranaghat, 14. Bangaon, 15. Barrackpore, 16. Dum Dum, 17. Barasat, 18. Basirhat, 19. Jaynagar, 20. Mathurapur, 21. Diamond Harbour, 22. Jadavpur, 23. Kolkata Dakshin, 24. Kolkata Uttar, 25. Howrah, 26. Uluberia, 27. Serampore, 28. Hooghly, 29. Arambagh, 30. Tamluk, 31, Kanthi, 32. Ghatal, 33. Jhargram, 34. Medinipur, 35. Purulia, 36. Bankura, 37. Bishnupur, 38. Bardhaman Purba, 39. Bardhaman Durgapur, 40. Asansol, 41. Bolpur, 42. Birbhum

As per order of the Delimitation Commission issued in 2006 in respect of the delimitation of constituencies in the West Bengal, parliamentary constituency no. 34 Medinipur is composed of the following segments:

#	Name	District	Member	Party	2024 Lead
218	Egra	Purba Medinipur	Dibyendu Adhikari	BJP	BJP
219	Dantan	Paschim Medinipur	Ajit Kumar Jana	BJP	AITC
223	Keshiary (ST)	Paschim Medinipur	Bhadra Hemram	BJP	AITC
224	Kharagpur Sadar	Paschim Medinipur	Dilip Ghosh	BJP	BJP
225	Narayangarh	Paschim Medinipur	Rama Prasad Giri	BJP	AITC
228	Kharagpur	Paschim Medinipur	Dinen Roy	AITC	AITC
236	Medinipur	Paschim Medinipur	Dr. Shankar Guchhait	BJP	AITC

Prior to delimitation, Midnapore Lok Sabha constituency was composed of the following assembly segments:Patashpur (assembly constituency no. 215), Midnapore (assembly constituency no. 223), Kharagpur Town (assembly constituency no. 224), Kharagpur Rural (assembly constituency no. 225), Keshiari (ST) (assembly constituency no. 226), Narayangarh (assembly constituency no. 227) and Dantan (assembly constituency no. 228)

== Members of Parliament ==
Year	Member	Party
1952 (Note: Midnapore-Jhargram)	Durga Charan Banerjee	Bharatiya Jana Sangh
1957 (Note: Midnapore-Jhargram)	Narasingha Malla Deb	Indian National Congress
1962	Govinda Kumar Singhu	Indian National Congress
1967	Sachindra Nath Maiti	Bangla Congress
1969^	V. K. Krishna Menon	Independent
1971	Subodh Chandra Hansda	Indian National Congress
1977	Sudhir Kumar Ghosal	Janata Party
1980	Narayan Choubey	Communist Party of India
1984	Narayan Choubey	Communist Party of India
1989	Indrajit Gupta	Communist Party of India
1991	Indrajit Gupta	Communist Party of India
1996	Indrajit Gupta	Communist Party of India
1998	Indrajit Gupta	Communist Party of India
1999	Indrajit Gupta	Communist Party of India
2001^	Prabodh Panda	Communist Party of India
2004	Prabodh Panda	Communist Party of India
2009	Prabodh Panda	Communist Party of India
2014	Sandhya Roy	Trinamool Congress
2019	Dilip Ghosh	Bharatiya Janata Party
2024	June Malia	Trinamool Congress
2026 (Note: Switched to NCPI as part of AITC Rebels in Lok Sabha.)	June Malia	Nationalist Citizens Party of India

^By poll

== Election results ==
Vote share of Winning candidates
2024	47.40%
2019	48.62%
2014	46.04%
2009	47.29%
2004	52.84%
2001 (By-Poll)	40.96%
1999	48.63%
1998	52.75%
1996	56.29%
1991	54.82%
1989	57.15%
1984	53.15%
1980	57.59%
1977	55.23%
1971	40.28%
1969 (By-Poll)	67.99%
1967	56.61%
1962	49.45%
1957	26.57%
1957	21.86%
1952	26.61%
1952	18.62%

=== 2024 ===
2024 Indian general election: Medinipur
Party	Candidate	Votes	%	±%
AITC	June Malia	702,192	47.40	▲5.09
BJP	Agnimitra Paul	675,001	45.56	▼3.06
CPI	Biplab Bhatta	57,785	3.90	▼0.52
NOTA	None of the Above	12,424	0.84	▼0.21
SUCI(C)	Anindita Jana	9,791	0.66	▲0.19
IND	Sanjib Dey	8,711	0.59	
BSP	Anjan (Babalu) Mandal	6,503	0.44	▼0.10
IND	Kamalesh Mahata	4,250	0.29	
IND	Sukesh Chandra Palmal	2,762	0.19	
IND	Biswajit Das	2,144	0.14	
Majority		27,191	1.84	▼4.47
Turnout		1,481,563	81.80	▼2.44
AITC gain from BJP		Swing		

=== 2019 ===
2019 Indian general election: Medinipur
Party	Candidate	Votes	%	±%
BJP	Dilip Ghosh	685,433	48.62	▲34.34
AITC	Manas Bhunia	596,481	42.31	▼3.73
CPI	Biplab Bhatta	62,319	4.42	▼26.94
INC	Sambhunath Chattapadhyay	20,807	1.48	▼2.40
NOTA	None of the Above	14,758	1.05	▼0.03
AMB	Rabindra Nath Bera	8,570	0.61	▼0.02
BSP	Ramkrishna Sarkar	7,568	0.54	▼0.15
SUCI(C)	Tushar Jana	6,603	0.47	▼0.31
IND	Tapas Kumar Kar	4,183	0.30	
SS	Ashoke Sarkar	3,093	0.22	
Majority		88,952	6.31	▼8.37
Turnout		1,410,321	84.24	▲0.22
BJP gain from AITC		Swing		

=== 2014 ===
2014 Indian general election: Medinipur
Party	Candidate	Votes	%	±%
AITC	Sandhya Roy	580,441	46.04	▲3.35
CPI	Prabodh Panda	395,313	31.36	▼15.93
BJP	Prabhakar Tewari	180,071	14.28	▲9.29
INC	Bimal Kumar Raj	48,914	3.88	
NOTA	None of the Above	13,616	1.08	
SUCI(C)	Tushar Jana	9,800	0.78	
BSP	Kavita Rani	8,640	0.69	▼0.48
AMB	Ashok Bera	7,881	0.63	
PDS	Soumen Samanta	6,070	0.48	
JMM	Mukim Khan	5,339	0.42	▼0.57
IND	Ramkrisna Sarkar	4,663	0.37	
Majority		185,128	14.68	▲10.08
Turnout		1,260,748	84.02	▲1.48
AITC gain from CPI		Swing		

=== 2009 ===
2009 Indian general election: Medinipur
Party	Candidate	Votes	%	±%
CPI	Prabodh Panda	493,021	47.29	▼5.55
AITC	Dipak Kumar Ghosh	445,004	42.69	
BJP	Pradip Patnaik	52,061	4.99	▼30.15
BSP	Asok Kumar Golder	12,216	1.17	
IND	Sanjay Mishra	11,092	1.06	
JMM	Nepal Das	10,324	0.99	
IND	Partha Addhya	6,974	0.67	
IND	Amit Moitra	4,290	0.41	
RDMP	Mukul Kumar Maiti	4,016	0.39	
IND	De Sukumar	3,498	0.34	
Majority		48,017	4.60	▼13.10
Turnout		1,042,496	82.54	
CPI hold		Swing		

=== 2004 ===
2004 Indian general election: Midnapore
Party	Candidate	Votes	%	±%
CPI	Prabodh Panda	480,034	52.84	▲11.88
BJP	Rahul Sinha	319,274	35.14	▲20.35
INC	Narayan Chandra Paria	68,338	7.52	
IND	Panchanan Pradhan	10,243	1.13	
NCP	Madhumanti Sengupta	9,901	1.09	▼7.17
IND	Mritunjoy Chakraborty	9,440	1.04	
JKP(N)	Asit Kumar Khatua	7,249	0.80	
SS	Lalit Kumar Jaiswal	4,020	0.44	
Majority		160,760	17.70	▲9.52
Turnout		908,499		
CPI hold		Swing		

=== 2001 by-election ===
A by-election was held in this constituency in 2001 which was necessitated by the death of sitting MP Indrajit Gupta. In the by-election, Prabodh Panda of Communist Party of India defeated his nearest rival Manoranjan Dutta of Trinamool Congress.

2001 Lok Sabha by-election: Midnapore
Party	Candidate	Votes	%	±%
CPI	Prabodh Panda	436,237	40.96	▼7.67
AITC	Manoranjan Dutta	349,044	32.78	
BJP	Debasish Chattopadhyay	157,543	14.79	▼30.46
NCP	Amal Mazumder	87,983	8.26	
JD(S)	Bijoy Bandyopadhyay	25,114	2.36	
IND	Rabikanta Santra	5,112	0.48	
RJP	Ashok Kumar Bera	3,871	0.36	
Majority		87,193	8.18	▲4.80
Turnout		877,213	77.10	▼1.35
CPI hold		Swing		

=== 1999 ===
1999 Indian general election: Midnapore
Party	Candidate	Votes	%	±%
CPI	Indrajit Gupta	414,545	48.63	▼4.12
BJP	Manoranjon Dutta	385,772	45.25	▲24.61
INC	Samir Roy	47,013	5.51	▼5.06
IND	Akshay Kumar Khan	4,512	0.53	
IND	Mritunjoy Chakraborty	650	0.08	
Majority		28,773	3.38	▼28.73
Turnout		862,567	78.45	▼2.39
CPI hold		Swing		

=== 1998 ===
1998 Indian general election: Midnapore
Party	Candidate	Votes	%	±%
CPI	Indrajit Gupta	452,671	52.75	▼3.54
BJP	Manoranjan Dutta	177,152	20.64	▲13.87
AITC	Dr. Nitish Sengupta	131,352	15.31	
INC	Satish Chandra Jana	90,737	10.57	▼21.45
IND	Sheik Abu Bakar	3,448	0.40	
JKP	Kalipada Tudu	1,702	0.20	
AMB	Gajen Nayak	1,148	0.13	▼0.77
Majority		275,519	32.11	▲7.84
Turnout		874,531	80.84	▼3.70
CPI hold		Swing		

=== 1996 ===
1996 Indian general election: Midnapore
Party	Candidate	Votes	%	±%
CPI	Indrajit Gupta	488,569	56.29	▲1.47
INC	D. P. Roy	277,920	32.02	▼0.18
BJP	Manoranjan Datta	58,751	6.77	▼2.74
IND	Sudeb Banprasthi	9,290	1.07	
AMB	Naba Kumar Shau	7,828	0.90	
IND	Dilip Maiti	7,286	0.84	
JKP(N)	Jatin Pratihar	7,008	0.81	
IND	Debashish Konar	2,313	0.27	
HJKP	Shachin Mahato	2,305	0.27	
IUML	Sarif Mollick	1,831	0.21	
JKP	Prabhakar Mahato	1,721	0.20	
SAP	Padma Lochan Roy	1,046	0.12	
IND	Ajit Kumar Maity	772	0.09	
IND	Vivek Kumar Baderia	742	0.09	
IND	Sushil Kumar	294	0.03	
IND	Satyanarayan Kothoyala	260	0.03	
Majority		210,649	24.27	▲1.65
Turnout		889,188	84.54	▲8.08
CPI hold		Swing		

=== 1991 ===
1991 Indian general election: Midnapore
Party	Candidate	Votes	%	±%
CPI	Indrajit Gupta	396,281	54.82	▼2.33
INC	Birendra Bijoy Malladev	232,758	32.20	▼7.29
BJP	Monoranjan Dutta	68,772	9.51	
IND	Dilip Maity	6,372	0.88	
JP	Mirza Ohidur Rahaman	5,550	0.77	
IND	Padma Lochan Roy	4,717	0.65	
HJP	Chandra Mohan Hansda	4,526	0.63	
BSP	Satish Chandra Biswas	1,852	0.26	▼0.07
DDP	Satya Naraiyan Kotwala	1,335	0.18	▲0.09
IND	Sushil Kumar	678	0.09	
Majority		163,523	22.62	▲4.96
Turnout		734,499	76.46	▼4.06
CPI hold		Swing		

=== 1989 ===
1989 Indian general election: Midnapores
Party	Candidate	Votes	%	±%
CPI	Indrajit Gupta	428,260	57.15	▲4.00
INC	Gouri Choubey	295,940	39.49	▼4.15
JKD	Dulal Chandra Murmu	12,650	1.69	
IND	Dilip Maiti	6,522	0.87	
BSP	Satish Chandra Biswas	2,456	0.33	
AMB	Dinabandhu Mukherjee	2,070	0.28	
IND	Sushil Kumar	810	0.11	
DDP	Satyanarayan Kotwala	708	0.09	
Majority		132,320	17.66	▲8.15
Turnout		760,379	80.52	▲0.47
CPI hold		Swing		

=== 1984 ===
1984 Indian general election: Midnapore
Party	Candidate	Votes	%	±%
CPI	Narayan Choubey	318,511	53.15	▼4.44
INC	Ajit Kumar Khanra	261,514	43.64	▲11.98
IND	Abdul Rahim	5,677	0.95	
SUCI(C)	Dilip Maiti	3,927	0.66	▼0.28
IND	Bachneshwar Saha	2,527	0.42	
IND	Gour Hari Bhattacharya	1,868	0.31	
IND	Ashoke Chandra Dey	1,550	0.26	
IND	Jitendra Nath De	1,344	0.22	
IND	Indra Deo Das	762	0.13	
IND	Sushil Kumar	666	0.11	
IND	Tarak Das Dutta	522	0.09	
IND	Mirza Ohidur Rahaman Beg	424	0.07	
Majority		56,997	9.51	▼16.42
Turnout		609,529	80.05	▲6.69
CPI hold		Swing		

=== 1980 ===
1980 Indian general election: Midnapore
Party	Candidate	Votes	%	±%
CPI	Narayan Choubey	276,144	57.59	▲12.82
INC(I)	Sudhir Kumar Ghosal	151,793	31.66	
JP	Narendra Das	28,618	5.97	▼49.26
INC(U)	Gyan Singh Sohanpal	9,882	2.06	
SUCI(C)	Bhusan Mondal	4,506	0.94	
JKD	Dulai Chandra Murmu	4,305	0.90	
IND	Satya Ghosh	3,134	0.65	
IND	Bhim Charan Tudu	1,095	0.23	
Majority		124,351	25.93	▲15.47
Turnout		490,282	73.36	▲14.92
CPI gain from JP		Swing		

=== 1977 ===
1977 Indian general election: Midnapore
Party	Candidate	Votes	%	±%
JP	Sudhir Kumar Ghosal	180,061	55.23	
CPI	Choubey Narayan	145,937	44.77	▲10.81
Majority		34,124	10.46	▲4.14
Turnout		338,254	58.44	▼10.41
JP gain from INC		Swing		

=== 1971 ===
1971 Indian general election: Midnapore
Party	Candidate	Votes	%	±%
INC	Subodh Chandra Hansda	140,326	40.28	▼3.11
CPI	Choubey Narayan	118,317	33.96	
CPI(M)	Subhendu Roy	39,569	11.36	
INC(O)	Krishna Das Roy	29,985	8.61	
BAC	Binoyendra Nath Dasgupta	20,193	5.80	▼50.81
Majority		22,009	6.32	▼6.90
Turnout		364,697	68.85	▼2.40
INC gain from Independent		Swing		

=== 1969 by-election ===
1969 Lok Sabha by-election: Midnapore
Party	Candidate	Votes	%	±%
IND	V. K. Krishna Menon	187,850	67.99	
INC	K. D. Roy	81,083	29.35	
IND	P. Reazuddin	7,376	2.67	
Majority		106,767	38.64	
Turnout				
Independent gain from INC		Swing		

=== 1967 ===
1967 Indian general election: Midnapore
Party	Candidate	Votes	%	±%
BAC	S. N. Maity	185,407	56.61	
INC	G. K. Singha	142,124	43.39	
Majority		43,283	13.22	
Turnout		339,374	71.25	
Bangla Congress gain from INC		Swing		

=== 1962 ===
1962 Indian general election: Midnapur
Party	Candidate	Votes	%	±%
INC	Gobinda Kumar Singhu	131,291	49.45	
CPI	Soroj Roy	93,872	35.36	
PSP	Durga Prasanna Satpathi	29,234	11.01	
ABJS	Satyendra Nath Bose	6,110	2.30	
HM	Ranajit Singha Sahas Roy	4,988	1.88	
Majority		37,419	14.09	
Turnout		274,849	54.48	
INC win (new seat)				

=== 1957 ===
1957 Indian general election: Midnapur (2-member constituency)
Party	Candidate	Votes	%	±%
INC	Narasingha Malla Deb	194,817	26.57	
INC	Subodh Hansda	160,252	21.86	
CPI	Rabindra Nath Mitra	155,005	21.14	
PSP	Chandra Mohan Saren	128,556	17.54	
ABJS	Amiya Krishna Khan	62,171	8.48	
IND	Charu Chandra Besra	32,284	4.40	
Turnout		733,085	42.76	

=== 1952 ===
1952 Indian general election: Midnapore Jhargram (2-member constituency)
Party	Candidate	Votes	%	±%
ABJS	Durga Charan Banerjee	151,494	26.61	
INC	Atul Chandra Basu	105,986	18.62	
KMPP	Bishnupada Hazra	91,171	16.02	
INC	Bharat Lal Tudu	76,921	13.51	
KMPP	Subodh Hansda	72,803	12.79	
FBL(MG)	Pran Krishna Mahato	39,634	6.96	
IND	Mahendra Santlal	31,198	5.48	
Turnout		569,207	38.32	

== See also ==
- Paschim Medinipur district
- List of constituencies of the Lok Sabha
