= Sudhir Kumar Ghosal =

Indian politician

Member of Parliament, Lok Sabha
- In office 1977-1980
- Preceded by: Subodh Chandra Hansda
- Succeeded by: Narayan Choubey
- Constituency: Midnapore, West Bengal

Personal details
- Born: June 1920 Sahaspore, Midnapore district, Bengal Presidency, British India
- Party: Janata Party
- Spouse: Ambu Rani Ghosal

Sudhir Kumar Ghosal is an Indian politician. He was elected to the Lok Sabha, lower house of the Parliament of India from Midnapore, West Bengal as a member of the Janata Party.
