= Prodyut Kumar Ghosh =

Indian politician

Member of the West Bengal Legislative Assembly
- In office 2016–2021
- Preceded by: Surjya Kanta Mishra
- Succeeded by: Surja Kanta Atta
- Constituency: Narayangarh

Personal details
- Party: Trinamool Congress
- Education: Calcutta University
- Profession: Politician, Advocate

Prodyut Kumar Ghosh is an Indian politician from West Bengal. He was elected as a Member of the Legislative Assembly in 2016 West Bengal Legislative Assembly election from Narayangarh, as a member of the Trinamool Congress.
