= Durga Charan Banerjee =

Indian jurist and politician

Member of Lok Sabha
- In office 1952–1957
- Succeeded by: Subodh Chandra Hansda
- Constituency: Midnapore Jhargram

Personal details
- Born: January 1898
- Died: 28 February 1958 (aged 60) Kolkata
- Party: Bharatiya Jana Sangh
- Education: Midnapore College, Scottish Church College, University of Calcutta

Durga Charan Banerjee (1898–1958) was a Bengali-speaking Indian jurist and a member of parliament of the first Lok Sabha.

== Early life and education ==
He was born to Anukul Charan Banerjee in Midnapore in January 1898. He was educated at the Midnapore College and at the Scottish Church College. Later he studied criminal law at the University of Calcutta. He married Triguna Debi in April 1913.

== Career ==
He had started out as a criminal lawyer. Later he served on the panel of public prosecutors. He had also worked as the Municipal Commissioner for the Midnapore municipality in 1921. Later he worked as the manager of the Diamond Amateur Theatre in Midnapore. He was related with the activities of the Ramakrishna Mission, Sebashram and hospital in Midnapore.

He was elected from the formerly named Lok Sabha constituency of Midnapore-Jhargram in the first Lok Sabha elections in 1952 as a candidate for the Bharatiya Jana Sangh.
