= Kharagpur Sadar Assembly constituency =

Kharagpur Sadar
- Constituency No. 224 for the West Bengal Legislative Assembly
- Interactive Map Outlining Kharagpur Sadar Assembly Constituency

Constituency details
- Country: India
- Region: East India
- State: West Bengal
- District: Paschim Medinipur
- Lok Sabha constituency: Medinipur
- Established: 1951
- Total electors: 194,006
- Reservation: None

Member of Legislative Assembly
- 18th West Bengal Legislative Assembly
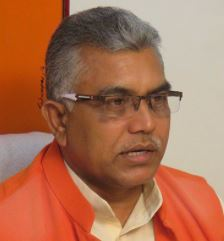
- Incumbent Dilip Ghosh
- Party: BJP
- Alliance: NDA
- Elected year: 2026
- Preceded by: Hiran Chatterjee

Kharagpur Sadar Assembly constituency (formerly Kharagpur Town) is an assembly constituency in Paschim Medinipur district in the Indian state of West Bengal.

Most Successful parties from Kharagpur Sadar assembly
1. Indian National Congress (10 times) (55.6%)
2. Communist Party of India (3 times) (16.7%)
3. Bharatiya Janata Party (3 times) (16.7%)
4. All India Trinamool Congress (1 time) (5.55%)
5. Janata Party (1 times) (5.55%)

== Overview ==
As per orders of the Delimitation Commission, No. 224 Kharagpur Sadar Assembly constituency is composed of the following: Kharagpur municipality and Kharagpur Railway Settlement of Kharagpur I community development block.

Kharagpur Sadar Assembly constituency is part of No. 34 Medinipur Lok Sabha constituency.

== Members of the Legislative Assembly ==
Year	Member	Party
1957	Narayan Choubey	Communist Party of India
1962	Narayan Choubey	Communist Party of India
1967	Narayan Choubey	Communist Party of India
1969	Gyan Singh Sohanpal	Indian National Congress
1971	Gyan Singh Sohanpal	Indian National Congress
1972	Gyan Singh Sohanpal	Indian National Congress
1977	Sudhir Das Sharma	Janata Party
1982	Gyan Singh Sohanpal	Indian National Congress
1987	Gyan Singh Sohanpal	Indian National Congress
1991	Gyan Singh Sohanpal	Indian National Congress
1996	Gyan Singh Sohanpal	Indian National Congress
2001	Gyan Singh Sohanpal	Indian National Congress
2006	Gyan Singh Sohanpal	Indian National Congress
2011	Gyan Singh Sohanpal	Indian National Congress
2016	Dilip Ghosh	Bharatiya Janata Party
2019^	Pradip Sarkar	Trinamool Congress
2021	Hiran Chatterjee	Bharatiya Janata Party
2026	Dilip Ghosh	Bharatiya Janata Party

- ^ denotes by-election

== Election results ==
=== 2026 ===
2026 West Bengal Legislative Assembly election: Kharagpur Sadar
Party	Candidate	Votes	%	±%
BJP	Dilip Ghosh	89,885	55.60	▲9.15
AITC	Pradip Sarkar	59,379	36.73	▼7.52
CPI(M)	Madhusudan Roy	5,451	3.37	New entry
INC	Papiya Chakraborty	2,879	1.78	▼4.52
NOTA	None of the above	1,290	0.8	▼0.74
Majority		30,506	18.87	▲16.67
Turnout		161,661	89.43	▲16.40
BJP hold		Swing		

=== 2021 ===
2021 West Bengal Legislative Assembly election: Kharagpur Sadar
Party	Candidate	Votes	%	±%
BJP	Hiran Chatterjee	79,607	46.45	
AITC	Pradip Sarkar	75,836	44.25	
INC	Reeta Sharma	10,791	6.30	
NOTA	None of the above	2,643	1.54	
Majority		3,771	2.20	
Turnout		171,385	73.03	
BJP gain from AITC		Swing		

=== 2019 ===
A bye-poll was necessitated due to the election of the incumbent MLA, Dilip Ghosh, to the Lok Sabha.

Bye-election, 2019: Kharagpur Sadar
Party	Candidate	Votes	%	±%
AITC	Pradip Sarkar	72,893	47.66	+25.93
BJP	Prem Chandra Jha	52,040	34.02	−5.27
INC	Chittaranjan Mandal	22,631	14.28	−7.45
NOTA	None of the above	1,705	1.11	−0.41
IND	Mata Prasad Gupta	1,273	0.83	+0.22
Majority		20,853	13.64	+9.6
Turnout		152,959	68.00	
AITC gain from BJP		Swing		

=== 2016 ===
2016 West Bengal Legislative Assembly election: Kharagpur Sadar
Party	Candidate	Votes	%	±%
BJP	Dilip Ghosh	61,446	39.29	▲32.50
INC	Gyan Singh Sohanpal	55,137	35.25	▼19.81
AITC	Rama Prasad Tewary	34,086	21.73	N/A
SUCI(C)	Suranjan Mahapatra	1,308	0.83	▼0.28
BSP	Sk. Asgar Ali	1,058	0.67	▲0.01
NOTA	None of the above	2,392	1.52	N/A
Majority		6,309	4.04	▼19.5
Turnout		156,487	71.71	
BJP gain from INC		Swing	▲26.16	

=== 2011 ===
2011 West Bengal Legislative Assembly election: Kharagpur Sadar
Party	Candidate	Votes	%	±%
INC	Gyan Singh Sohanpal	75,425	55.54	
CPI(M)	Anil Kumar Das	43,056	31.43	
BJP	Prem Chandra Jha	9,303	6.79	
IND	Satya Deo Sharma	5,191	3.78	
SUCI(C)	Suranjan Mahapatra	1,525	1.11	
Majority		32,369	23.63	
Turnout		138,134	70.78	
INC hold		Swing	#	

.# CPI(M) did not contest this seat in 2006.

=== 2006 ===
Gyan Singh Sohanpal of Congress won the Kharagpur Town assembly seat for six times in a row from 1982 to 2006 (for earlier victories see below), defeating Prem Chandra Jha of RJD in 2006, Lalji Pandey of CPI(M) in 2001, Kalidas Nayek of CPI(M) in 1996 and 1991, and Jatindra Mitra of CPI(M) in 1987 and 1982. Contests in most years were multi cornered but only winners and runners are being mentioned. Sudhir Das Sharma of Janata Party defeated Jatindra Mitra of CPI(M) in 1977.

=== 1972 ===
Gyan Singh Sohanpal of Congress won in 1972, 1971 and 1969. Narayan Choubey of CPI won in 1967, 1962 and 1957. In independent India's first election in 1951, Kharagpur had a single seat, which was won by Moulana Muhammad Momtaz of Congress.
