= Sheikh Najmul Haque =

West Bengal politician

Member of West Bengal Legislative Assembly
- In office 2011–2016
- Preceded by: Constituency established
- Succeeded by: Dinen Roy
- Constituency: Kharagpur
- In office 1987–2011
- Preceded by: Sheikh Siraj Ali
- Succeeded by: Constituency abolished
- Constituency: Kharagpur Rural

Personal details
- Born: September 10, 1951 (age 74) Pelagerya, Midnapore district, Bengal Presidency
- Party: Communist Party of India (Marxist)
- Education: Midnapore College
- Alma mater: University of Calcutta

Sheikh Najmul Haque (born 10 September 1951) was an Indian politician and farmer. He served as a member of the West Bengal Legislative Assembly for nearly thirty years.

== Early life and family ==
Haque was born on 10 September 1951 to a Bengali family of Muslim Sheikhs in the village of Pelagerya in Midnapore district, Bengal Presidency. He is the son of Sheikh Shamsul Haque, and was the son-in-law of Mirza Jamaluddin Chishti. Haque studied at the Madpur Higher Secondary School and Midnapore College. He graduated with a Bachelor of Arts degree from the University of Calcutta in 1973.

== Career ==
Haque was a farmer. He contested in the 1987 West Bengal Legislative Assembly election where he ran as a Communist Party of India (Marxist) candidate for Kharagpur Rural Assembly constituency. Haque contested in the 1991 West Bengal Legislative Assembly election and was re-elected to Kharagpur Rural. He contested in the 1996 West Bengal Legislative Assembly election and was re-elected to Kharagpur Rural. Haque contested in the 2001 West Bengal Legislative Assembly election and was re-elected to Kharagpur Rural. He contested in the 2006 West Bengal Legislative Assembly election and was re-elected to Kharagpur Rural. Haque was a member of the Committee on Petitions. Haque contested in the 2011 West Bengal Legislative Assembly election and was elected to the new Kharagpur Assembly constituency, winning against Trinamool politician Bilkis Khanam.
