= V. K. Krishna Menon =

Former Indian Defence Minister

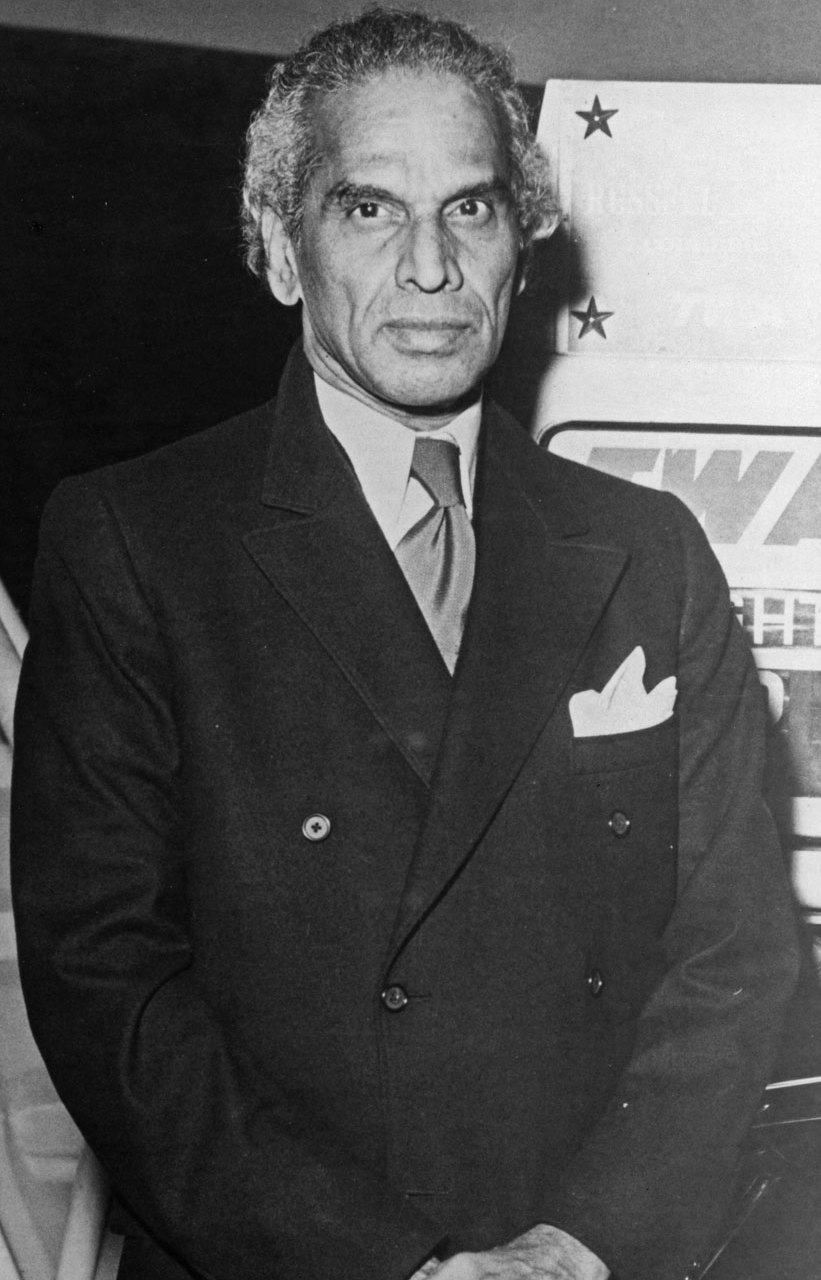
- Menon, c. 1950s

Union Minister for Defence
- In office 17 April 1957 – 31 October 1962
- Prime Minister: Jawaharlal Nehru
- Preceded by: Kailash Nath Katju
- Succeeded by: Yashwantrao Chavan

Member of Parliament, Lok Sabha
- In office 1957–1967
- Preceded by: Vithal Balkrishna Gandhi
- Succeeded by: Constituency Abolished
- Constituency: Bombay City North
- In office 1969–1971
- Preceded by: Sachindra Nath Maity
- Succeeded by: Subodh Chandra Hansda
- Constituency: Midnapore
- In office 1971–1974
- Preceded by: P. Viswambharan
- Succeeded by: M. N. Govindan Nair
- Constituency: Trivandrum

Member of Parliament, Rajya Sabha
- In office 1953–1957
- Preceded by: N. Gopalaswami Ayyangar
- Succeeded by: P J Thomas
- Constituency: Madras (1953–56); Kerala (1956–57)

Indian Ambassador to Ireland
- In office 1949–1952
- Prime Minister: Jawaharlal Nehru
- Preceded by: Position established
- Succeeded by: B. G. Kher

Indian High Commissioner to the United Kingdom
- In office August 1947 – 1952
- Prime Minister: Jawaharlal Nehru
- Preceded by: M. K. Vellodi (Acting)
- Succeeded by: B. G. Kher

Personal details
- Born: Vengalil Krishnan Krishna Menon; 3 May 1896 Thalassery, Kannur district, Madras Presidency, British India (now in Kerala)
- Died: 6 October 1974 (aged 78) Delhi, India
- Party: Indian National Congress
- Other political affiliations: Indian National Congress; India League; Labour Party
- Parents: Komath Krishna Kurup (father); Lakshmi Kutty Amma (mother)
- Education: Presidency College (BA); Madras Law College; London School of Economics (BSc, MSc); University College London (MA); Middle Temple (Barrister-at-Law)
- Awards: See below
- Source: Parliament of India

Vengalil Krishnan Krishna Menon (Malayalam: [ʋeŋːaːlil krʂɳɐn krʂɳɐ menoːn]) (3 May 1896 – 6 October 1974) was an Indian academic, independence activist, politician, lawyer, and statesman. Menon contributed to the Indian independence movement and India's foreign relations. He was among the major architects of Indian foreign policy, was India's first High Commissioner to the United Kingdom and later India's Defence Minister.

In 1928, Menon founded the India League in London to demand total independence from the British rule in the Indian subcontinent. Whilst in Britain he worked as an editor and helped found Pelican Books. Towards the end of the 1940s, he presided Indo-British matters and caused the selection of the last British Viceroy of India, Louis Mountbatten. He worked with Nehru, Mountbatten, Sardar Patel, and V.P. Menon to work out the mechanics of Indian independence.

After the independence of India, he facilitated international diplomacy and resolutions in situations such as the Suez Crisis, Korean War, invasion of Hungary, Cyprus, Indochina, Taiwan, and the Chinese capture of American airmen, while supporting the anti-colonial ethos of what he would eventually name the Non-Aligned Movement. Since the independence of India, he served as High Commissioner to the United Kingdom, Ambassador to the United Nations, and Defence minister. As a Defence minister, he played a role in military conflicts such as Congo Crisis, Annexation of Goa, and Sino-Indian War. During his tenure as defence minister, India saw establishment of domestic military-industrial complex and educational systems, the Sainik Schools, the Defence Research and Development Organization (DRDO), and other defence and military institutions, while professionalizing the National Cadet Corps and similar entities.

He was elected to both houses of the Indian parliament from constituencies such as Mumbai, Bengal, and Trivandrum in his native state of Kerala. He remained a member of the Lok Sabha until his death.

== Early life ==
=== Family ===
Menon was born into an aristocratic Komath Menon family at Thiruvangad, Thalassery, later moving to Panniyankara in Kozhikode, Kerala, where the Vengalil family too had their Tharavadu. His father, Advocate Vengalil Krishna Kurup was one of the leading criminal advocates of Thalassery and a member of Calicut Bar Association, only son of reigning Porlathiri Udaya Varma Raja of Kadathanad kingdom. His mother was Smt. Komath Sreedevi Menon, one of the wealthiest women of Kerala at that time who maintained Komath Nalukettu, Sree Thazhe Komath Bhagavathi Temple in Ayanchery, and also maintained vast estates in Ayanchery and Kuttiyadi regions of Vatakara

=== Education ===
Menon had his early education in Ayanchery and Thalassery and later pursued his higher education at the Zamorin's College, Kozhikode. In 1918, he graduated from Presidency College, Chennai, with a B.A. in History and Economics. While studying in the Madras Law College, he was involved in Theosophy and was associated with Annie Besant and the Home Rule Movement. He was a member of the "Brothers of Service", founded by Annie Besant who helped him travel to England in 1924.

=== Life and activities in England ===
Menon studied at London School of Economics, securing Bachelor of Science in economics and Master of Science in economics from University of London. Whilst there he studied under Harold Laski who, according to historian Jack Bowman, became a great personal and political inspiration for Menon. Later, he studied at University College London and in 1930, he was awarded an M.A. in Industrial Psychology with first class honours from University of London, for a thesis entitled An Experimental Study of the Mental Processes Involved in Reasoning. In 1934, he secured a MSc in Political Science with first class honours from the London School of Economics, for a thesis titled English Political Thought in the Seventeenth Century.

In 1934, he continued to study law and was called to the bar at Middle Temple, marking the end of his formal education at the age of 37. As a barrister, Menon represented poor lascas pro bono, and, Udham Singh, in his trial for the killing of Michael O'Dwyer in vengeance for the Amritsar Massacre.

During the 1930s, Menon worked as an editor for The Bodley Head and its Twentieth Century Library (1932-1935), for Selwyn & Blount and its Topical Books series, and then, from 1937, for Penguin Books and its founder Sir Allen Lane. Menon was the editor of the educational series Pelican Books since its inception.

==== Political life in the UK ====
After joining the Labour Party he was elected borough councillor of St Pancras, London, in which context he befriended Edwina Mountbatten, wife of Lord Mountbatten. Due to the patronage of the Mountbattens, in the pre-war British society, Menon was able to consolidate political alliances with Labour potentates like Clement Attlee (future prime minister), Sir Stafford Cripps (future chancellor) and Aneurin Bevan, while gaining entry to the social circles of George VI and the then-Queen Elizabeth. Additional intimates included, political and intellectual figures such as Bertrand Russell, J.B.S. Haldane, Michael Foot, E.M. Forster, and Queen Frederica of Greece. St. Pancras, later gave him the "Freedom of the Borough", the other person having received this, was George Bernard Shaw. In 1939, the Labour Party began preparations to nominate him as its candidate for the Dundee Parliamentary constituency but that fell through because of his perceived connections with the Communist Party. He resigned (or was expelled, according to other sources) from the Labour Party in protest but rejoined in 1944.

==== India League and the independence movement ====
In 1928, Menon founded the India League to demand total independence of India from British rule. He worked as a journalist and as president of the India League from 1928 to 1947. In 1930s, Menon along with other contributors had created a 554-page report on the situation in India. The report was banned in India. Menon worked to help Nehru succeed Mahatma Gandhi as the moral leader and executive of the Indian independence movement, and to support Nehru's accession as the first Prime Minister of an independent India. As Secretary, he built the India League into the Indian lobby in the British Parliament, and turned British sentiment towards the cause of Indian independence. In 1931, Mahatma Gandhi praised the efforts of the Indian League for its "hurricane propaganda on the danger to world peace of a rebellious India in bondage".

He also took interest in the Colonial Seamen's Association from which he met Chris Braithwaite and Surat Alley. During the first years of World War II, Menon joined British communists in condemning both the Western Allies and Nazi Germany, though he also took part in several anti-Nazi demonstrations in Britain. Once, when asked whether the Indian public would prefer British or German rule, Menon replied that "[one] might as well ask a fish if it prefers to be fried in butter or margarine".

Menon, a prominent speaker was invited to speak at Central School, Doncaster in 1942 advocating for the India National Congress and ability of Indian peoples to govern themselves, ideas which met favourably by Doncaster's citizens.

== Roles in post-independence India ==
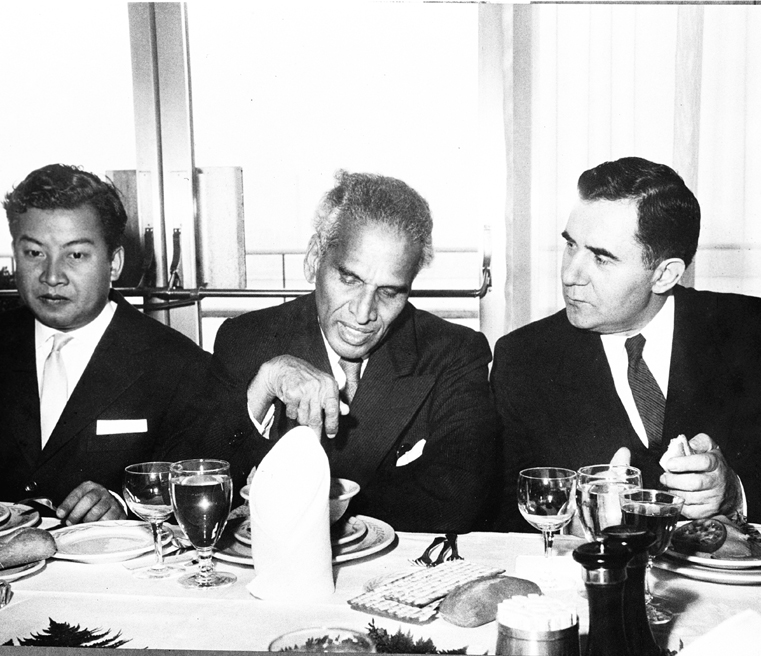
V.K. Krishna Menon (age 62) giving a luncheon in 1958 in honour of His Royal Highness Prince Norodom Sihanouk and Andrei Gromyko, Foreign Minister of the Soviet Union.

=== High Commissioner to the United Kingdom ===
After India gained independence in 1947, Menon was appointed High Commissioner of India to the United Kingdom, a post in which he remained until 1952. Menon's distrust of the West extended to the United Kingdom, and his opposition to British political manoeuvres led MI5 to deem him a "serious menace to security". From 1929 onwards, Menon had been kept under surveillance, with a warrant to intercept his correspondence being issued in December 1933, identifying him as an "important worker in the Indian revolutionary movement". Clandestine surveillance intensified following Menon's 1946 meeting in Paris with Soviet Foreign Minister Vyacheslav Molotov, and Indian independence. In 2007, hundreds of pages of MI5 files documenting their coverage of Menon were released, including transcripts of phone conversations and intercepted correspondences with other statesmen and Nehru himself.

In 1949, Menon was one of the drafters of the London Declaration, along with Sir Norman Brook, the British Cabinet Secretary. The declaration recognised that India could remain in the Commonwealth of Nations, despite becoming a republic. The declaration is considered the foundation of the modern Commonwealth.

During his tenure as the high commissioner, Menon was accused of being involved in the jeep scandal case, the first alleged case of corruption in independent India. In 1948, Menon had ignored protocols and signed a Rs 8 million contract for the purchase of army jeeps with a foreign firm for the Indo-Pakistani war of 1947–1948. The deal was later rescinded by the Indian deputy High Commissioner in London due to the failure of the completion of the order. The investigation into the matter was closed in 1955 after nothing was found against anybody including Menon.

=== India's representative to the United Nations ===
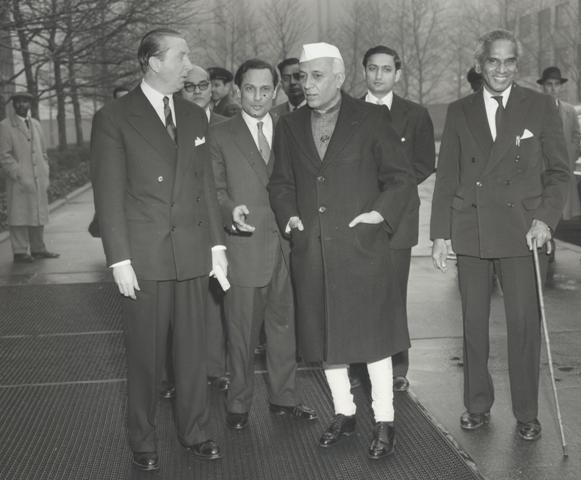
1st Prime Minister of India Jawaharlal Nehru with V. K. Krishna Menon (age 60) in United Nations in December 1956.

In 1949, Menon accepted the command of the Indian delegation to the United Nations, a position he held until 1962. He headed India's diplomatic missions to the United Kingdom and the United Nations, and established himself in diplomatic matters including the Suez Crisis. He engineered solutions to complex international political issues, including a peace plan for Korea, a ceasefire in Indo-China, the deadlocked disarmament talks, and the French withdrawal from the UN over Algeria.

Earlier, he led the overseas wing of the Indian independence movement, launching the India League in London in 1928, rallying within the United Kingdom to win public support for Indian independence, and of world powers such as the Soviet Union.

==== Diplomacy and non-alignment ====
During this period, Menon was a spokesman for Nehru's foreign policy, dubbed non-alignment in 1952, charting a third course between the US and the Soviet Union. Menon was critical of the United States, and expressed sympathies with Soviet policies, earning the ire of many Indians by voting against a UN resolution calling for the USSR to withdraw troops from Hungary, although he reversed his stance three weeks later under pressure from New Delhi.

In 1966, Indira Gandhi had consulted Menon for drafting a Vietnam plan which called for international efforts to rehabilitate Vietnam, Laos and Cambodia and criticised the United States for their role in the Vietnam War.

==== China and the United Nations ====
Menon also supported the admission of the People's Republic of China to the United Nations, which earned him the enmity of many American statesmen, including Senator William F. Knowland. In 1955, Menon intervened in the case of several American airmen who had been held by China, meeting with Chinese premier Zhou Enlai before flying to Washington to confer with and counsel American President Dwight Eisenhower and Secretary of State John Foster Dulles, at the request of British Prime Minister Anthony Eden.

==== Nuclear disarmament ====
Menon was an opponent of nuclear weapons, and partnered with many in his quest against their proliferation.

==== Suez Crisis ====
During the Suez Crisis, Menon attempted to persuade Gamal Nasser to compromise with the West, and facilitated moving Western powers towards an awareness that Nasser might prove willing to compromise. During the emergency conference on Suez convened in London, Menon, invited by British Prime Minister Anthony Eden, offered a counterproposal to John Foster Dulles' plan for resolution, in which Egypt would be allowed to retain control of the Suez Canal.

While known for his alignment with the British Labour party and its Commonwealth analogues, by the 1950s, world diplomats referred to Menon's allies, comprising Eden, British foreign minister Selwyn Lloyd, Canadian foreign minister and future premier Lester Pearson, Australian foreign minister and future governor-general Richard Casey, particularly to the fury of US Secretary of State Dean Acheson. Menon's proposal was estimated by US diplomats to have more support than the Dulles plan, and was viewed as an attempt to hybridise the Dulles plan with Egypt's claims. The Dulles plan passed, with Menon voting against, alongside Russia, Indonesia and Sri Lanka. Menon, however, softened his opposition in the final hours, leaving Soviet Foreign Minister Dmitri Shepilov in contraposition.

==== Speech on Kashmir ====
Why is that we have never heard voices in connection with the freedom of people under the suppression and tyranny of Pakistani authorities on the other side of the cease-fire line? Why is it that we have not heard here that in ten years these people have not seen a ballot paper? With what voice can either the Security Council or anyone coming before it demand a plebiscite for a people on our side who exercise franchise, who have freedom of speech, who function under a hundred local bodies?

— Excerpt from Menon's marathon 1957 address to the United Nations Security Council, The Hindu.

On 23 January 1957 Menon delivered an eight-hour speech defending India's stand on Kashmir. To date, the speech is the longest delivered in the United Nations, covering five hours of the 762nd meeting on 23 January, and two hours and forty-eight minutes on the 24th, concluding with Menon's collapse on the Security Council floor. Between the two parts, Menon collapsed from exhaustion and had to be hospitalized.

During the filibuster, Nehru went onto consolidate Indian power in Kashmir. Menon's defence of Indian sovereignty in Kashmir enlarged his base of support in India, and led to the Indian press dubbing him the "Hero of Kashmir".

=== Minister of Defence ===
Krishna Menon became a member of the Rajya Sabha in 1953 from Madras. In 1956, he joined the Union Cabinet as Minister without Portfolio and was made Minister of Defence in April 1957, after winning the North Mumbai seat to the Lok Sabha.

Menon developed India's domestic military-industrial complex and educational systems. During his reign as defence minister, India saw establishment of the Sainik Schools, the Defence Research and Development Organization (DRDO), and other defence and military institutions, while professionalizing the National Cadet Corps and similar entities.

Menon brought with him a degree of governmental, public, and international attention that India's military had not previously known. He suspended the seniority system within the army, replacing it with a merit-based method of promotion, and restructured much of India's military command system, eventually leading to the resignation of the Chief of the Army Staff, General K.S. Thimayya.

==== Congo Crisis ====
In 1960, Menon remarked on Congo crisis that freedom for African countries meant not only political independence but also the right to be able to develop economically and defend themselves from subversion from both inside and outside the country. Menon criticized the Belgians for not providing military training to the Congolese before leaving the country. In 1961, Nehru sent an Indian Army brigade of about 4,700 troops for the United Nations Operation in the Congo.

==== Annexation of Portuguese India ====
The annexation of Goa was linked with the 1961 elections to the Lok Sabha. Menon addressed the issue of Indian sovereignty over the Portuguese colony of Goa, in a partial reprise of his earlier defence of Kashmir. In New York, Menon met US Ambassador and two-time presidential candidate Adlai Stevenson behind closed doors, before meeting with President John F. Kennedy, who had expressed his reservations about Menon's anti-imperialism during the state visit of Nehru. Menon lectured Kennedy on the importance of US-Soviet compromise, before returning to India. On 17 December 1961, Menon and the Indian Army overran Goa, leading to Western condemnation. Menon dismissed the admonishments of Kennedy and Stevenson as "vestige(s) of Western imperialism". Indian annexation of Goa had subtle ramifications throughout Asia, as in the case of Indonesian president Sukarno, who refrained from invading the Portuguese colony of East Timor partially from fear of being compared to Menon. The invasion also spawned a complex mass of legal issues relating to differences between eastern and western interpretations of United Nations law and jurisdiction.

==== The Sino-Indian War ====
In 1962, China attacked India, leading to the Sino-Indian War and a temporary reversal in India's non-aligned foreign policy. On 14 October, about 6 days before the war, Menon gave a speech in Bangalore where he announced that India would fight "to the last man, to the last gun". Menon was criticized both inside and outside the parliament for his handling of the conflict. The Indian government's analysis, the Henderson Brooks–Bhagat report, remains classified. Menon believed that Pakistan – not China – was the real threat on the border. He was held responsible for India's lack of military preparation to repel China in the full-scale war to the extent that Indian politicians invested more effort in getting Menon removed than in actually waging war. Menon resigned on 31 October 1962 as Minister of Defence. Nevertheless, he remained a counselor to Nehru and continued to assist the Indian government with foreign policy.

=== As a Supreme Court advocate ===
Following his resignation from the cabinet ministry, Menon practiced as a Senior Advocate in the Supreme Court with a group of lawyers. He specifically focused on the Labour matters and he took them up without taking any fees. Former Supreme Court Judge V. R. Krishna Iyer remarked Menon's legal career as: "Great human causes, not petty problems, find the jurist in him. He is halting in humdrum areas but heroic in the higher values of our legalpolitical system."

== Elections ==
=== Rajya Sabha ===
Menon was elected to the Rajya Sabha in 1953 from Madras.

=== 1957 ===
In 1957, Menon sought a seat in the Lok Sabha, contesting a constituency from North Mumbai. Admired for his defence of India's sovereignty in Kashmir on the world stage, Menon was met with rapturous receptions on the campaign trail, and won in a contest against PSP candidate Alvares Peter Augustus by 47,741 votes (171,708 to 123,967).

We visited many villages. Huge crowds surged forward, blocking the streets, while Menon was drowned by the surrounding uproar, his umbrella knocked away by the bombardment of flowers and bouquets. He insisted, in spite of the heat of the day, the dust and the exhaustion, on fulfilling his programme.

— Eyewitness account of Menon's 1957 campaign, The Hindu.

=== 1961 ===
Menon was frequently vilified in the Western press, which described or depicted him as a "snake-charmer", as in TIME magazine's 1962 cover portrait.

In October 1961, Menon, the sitting Defence Minister, was challenged by the 74-year-old Acharya Kripalani, a previous president of the Indian National Congress. The race, which witnessed the direct intervention of Jawaharlal Nehru, was viewed as of importance due to the personas and influence of the two candidates. Having previously endorsed Menon's foreign policies, Kripalani attacked Menon's persona, seeking to avoid confrontation with the prestige of Nehru and the Congress Party. Menon won nearly doubling the vote total of Kripalani, and winning majorities in all six of North Mumbai's districts. The electoral results established Menon as second to Nehru in Indian politics.

=== 1967 ===
In 1967, Menon was denied a seat from Mumbai by the Congress on the grounds that he was a non-Maharashtrian after Congress leadership in Delhi had succumbed to the demands of the Bombay Provincial Congress Committee. This move by the committee had appalled Prime Minister Indira Gandhi who remarked that: "Here is a question of whom the party wants and whom the people want. My position among people is uncontested." Menon resigned from the Congress and stood for elections as an independent candidate from the North East Mumbai constituency, of which he was the sitting member of parliament. He lost to the Congress candidate, Mr. S.G. Barve, a retired ICS officer, by a margin of 13,169 votes. Mr. Barve died later that year, and his sister, Mrs. Tara Sapre, contested the by-election which ensued as the Congress candidate. Menon again stood as an independent, and lost to Mrs. Tara Sapre by a wider margin than had been the case with her brother. In both, 1967 and 1969 elections, Shiv Sena had campaigned for both of the Congress candidates.

=== 1969 ===
In 1969, Menon contested a seat in the Lok Sabha from the Bengal constituency of Midnapore, running as an independent in a by-election, and defeating his Congress rival by a margin of 106,767 votes in May of that year.

=== 1971 ===
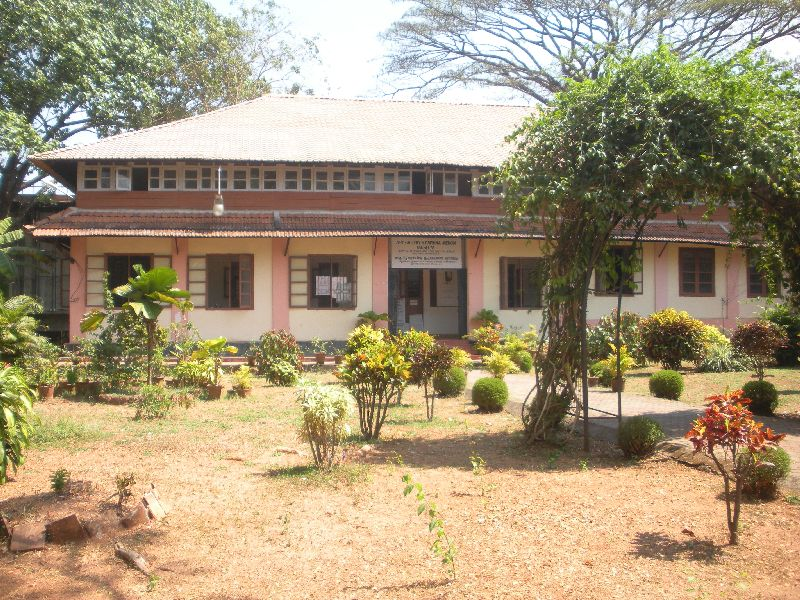
Krishna Menon Museum, Kozhikode, where original oil portraits of Menon, as well as personal belongings, letters, news clips, and other materials related to Menon, are kept for public display.

In 1971, Menon contested as an independent candidate and was elected to the Lok Sabha from Trivandrum, in his home state of Kerala.

== Legacy ==
=== Evaluations ===
Menon was a significant figure of the Indian politics during his life, and has remained so even well after his death. In response to US Secretary of State John Foster Dulles' assertion that US weapons supplied to Pakistan were intended for defence against a Soviet invasion, Menon stated that "the world has yet to see an American gun that can only shoot in one direction", and that "I am yet to come across a vegetarian tiger". In London, Menon responded to novelist Brigid Brophy: "my English is better than yours. You merely picked it up: I learnt it." When criticised for the Rolls-Royces he kept as official vehicles, he replied, "I can scarcely hire a bullock-cart to call on 10 Downing Street".

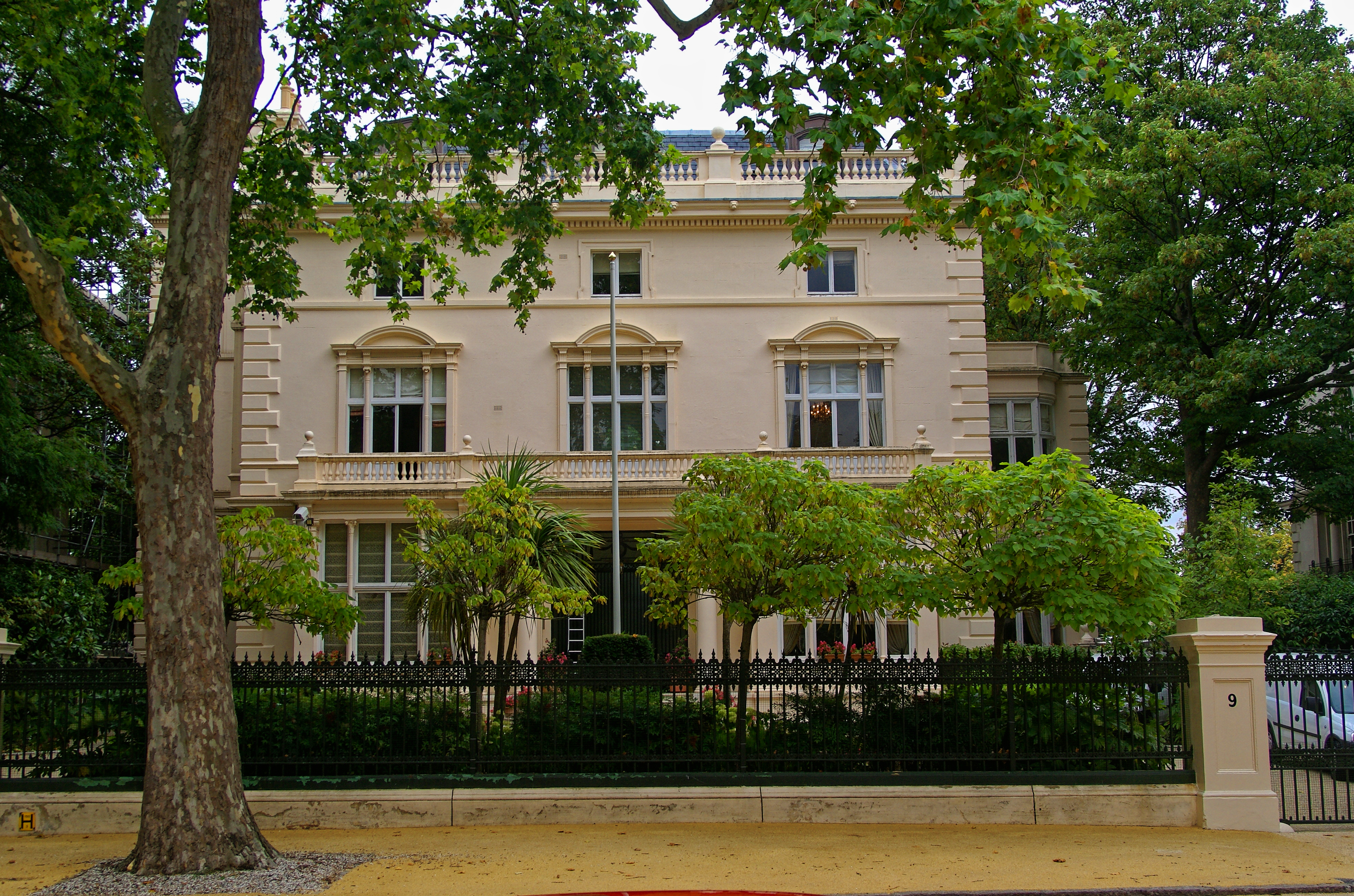
No. 9 Kensington Palace Gardens - the townhouse Menon purchased for the formal residence of the Indian High Commissioner, though he declined live there.

Indian President R. Venkataraman described him as "the epitome of a representative of the Indian State, personally abstemious but at the same time uncompromising in maintaining the prestige of his high office."

His meteoric rise was resented by many senior Congress leaders. At one time some used to believe that he would become successor to Nehru. Some of his Indian colleagues had a mixed view. Foreign Secretary Subimal Dutt commented that Menon, "did not always measure his words", while statesman K. R. Narayanan said, "India has been fortunate to have had not only a glorious heritage of culture and civilisation but a succession of great men from the Buddha to Gandhi, from Ashoka to Nehru, from Kautilya to Krishna Menon."

Menon was reviled by Western statesmen who loathed his arrogance and anti-Western stances. American President Dwight D. Eisenhower considered Menon a "menace", governed by ambition to prove himself the international manipulator and politician of the age". Western publications referred to him as "India's Rasputin" or "Nehru's Evil Genius".

Menon's role in the development of India's military infrastructure has attracted attention of analysts and scholars with regards to the importance of Menon's vision and foresight in military development. Political figures as varied as President and Minister of Defence R. Venkataraman and Justice V.R. Krishna Iyer of the Supreme Court of India have analysed and defended Menon's role in India's rise as a military power. Menon is often noted as the architect of self-sufficiency in India's defence production.

=== Intellectual reputation ===
Whether by his supporters or critics, Menon inspired adulation as well as detraction in both India and the West. To his supporters, he was an advocate of India in the face of Western imperialism, who "taught the white man his place". According to The Tribune, "Few Indians have dominated global politics or aroused as much awe and antagonism as V. K. Krishna Menon, one of the prominent personalities of the 20th century.

As a student, his tutor, Harold Laski, described him as the "best" and "brilliant" student he had, and the only one from whom he had learnt anything. While his thesis supervisor, Charles Spearman, in reviewing his work with C.E. Beeby, judged that "by virtue of intense intellectual study, together with natural capacity, he appears to have acquired mastery of psychological science. Furthermore he has shown capacities for both original investigation and also for exposition. He has, I believe, a distinguished career before him."

Another supervisor, John Flugel, predicted that when published Menon's dissertation "would (render him) one of the young and brilliant psychologists of this century." Bertrand Russell remarked that Menon was a "particularly brilliant young man" and "an exceptionally gifted and experienced speaker and typically representative of the advanced thought of modern young India".

P.N. Haksar attested to the "vastness of his intellectual perception". "From a intellectual point of view, I cannot remember having met any person with a keener intellect", commented Nehru in 1951. Shashi Tharoor, while noting his intolerance of those intellectually inferior to him and habitual rudeness, nonetheless highlighted his "brilliance and intellectual stamina' and mastery "of the extensive discourse on world affairs, human history and international politics that Menon so magisterially managed." Swedish Ambassador Alva Myrdal attributed Menon's hold over Nehru to Menon's brilliance and for being the "only genuinely intellectual foil Nehru had in his government, with whom he could discuss Marx and Mill, Dickens and Dostoevsky.

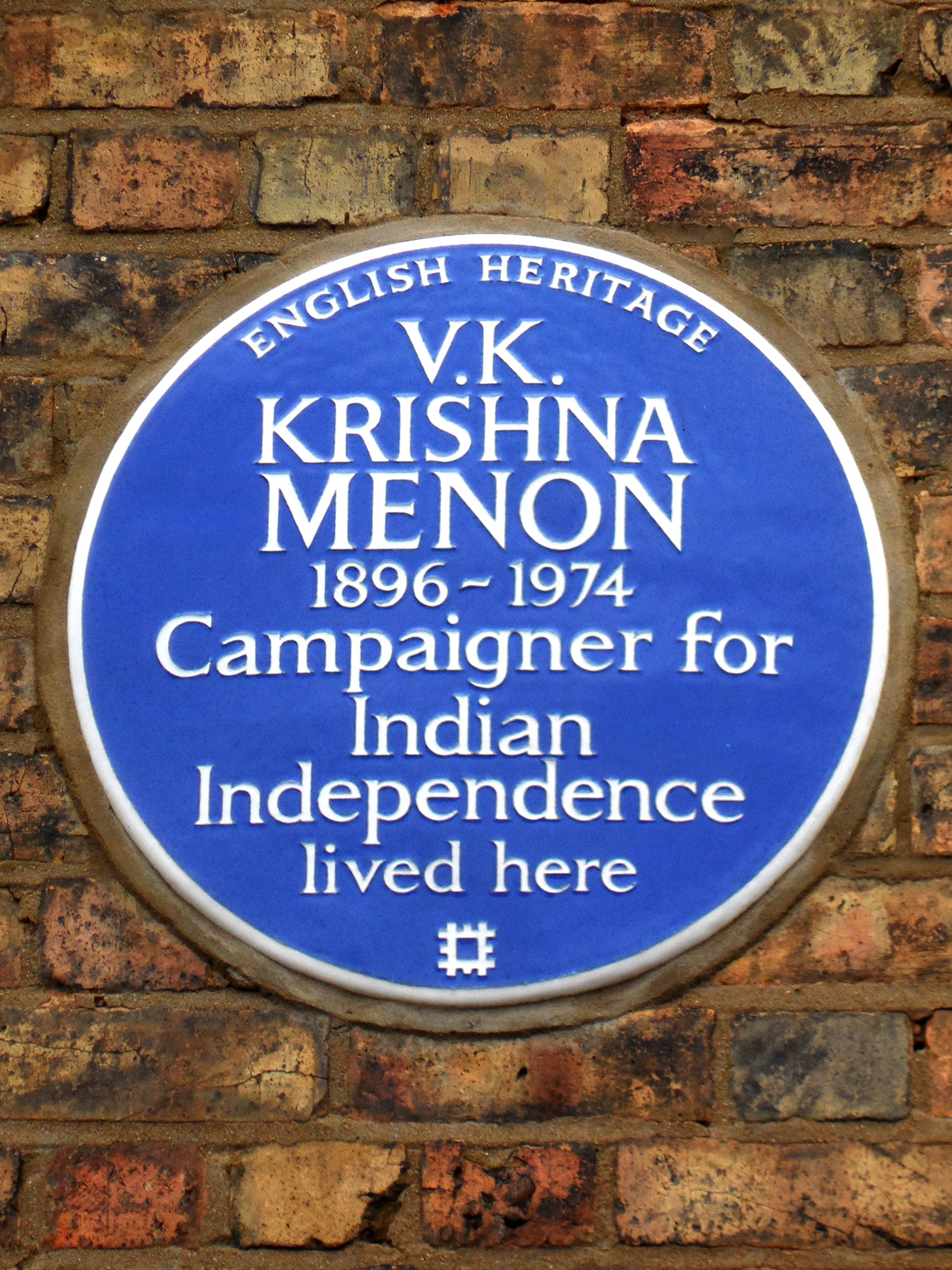
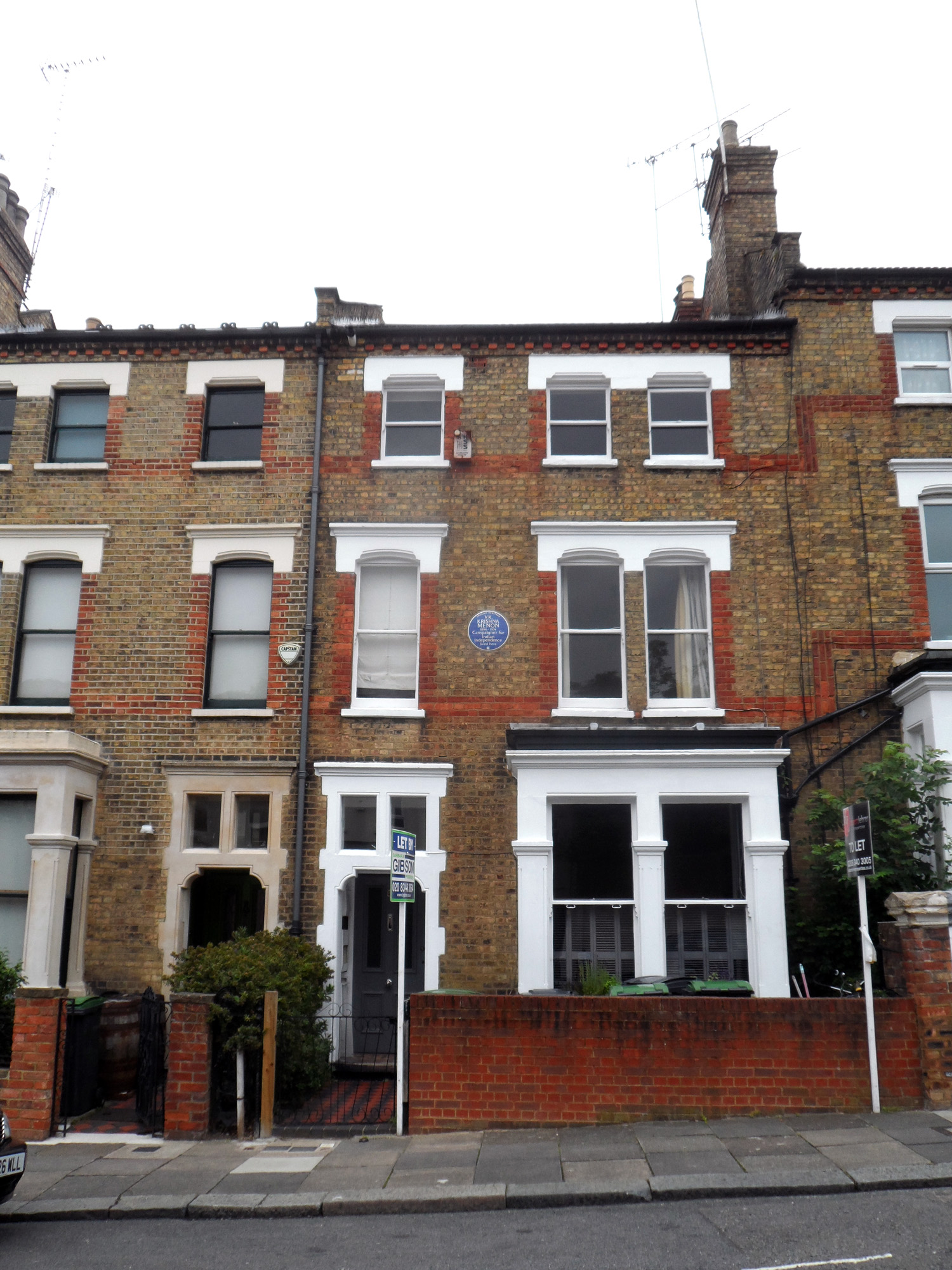
Blue plaque erected in 2013 by English Heritage at 30 Langdon Park Road, Highgate, London N6 5QG, London Borough of Haringey.

== Death ==
Menon fell ill about three months before his death when he was in London to attend a musical event, organised for raising donations for Nehru memorial fund. He was hospitalised on 4 October following exhaustion. He died at the age of 78 due to heart attack on 6 October 1974.

Indian President Fakhruddin Ali Ahmed said on his death that the country has lost an "eminent statesman and great leader". He added that:

"Menon was an intrepid fighter for the freedom of the country and carried on the struggle from England. He served free India with remarkable distinction and played a crucial role in the international forum. His mastery of the world, legal acumen and oratorical skill were always used to serve great causes."

Prime Minister Indira Gandhi described Menon as "unusually forceful contemporary who has left a distinctive mark on our political life". She added that:

"A volcano is extinct. Krishna Menon was a person of deep conviction, great intellectual power and passionate dedication to the country's cause. His pioneering work as spokesman of our freedom movement in Europe and as a link with radical movements of other countries is part of our nation's history. After independence he was one of the most eloquent exponents in the United Nations and other world forums, of policy of non-alignment and peaceful co-existence and our opposition to all forms of colonialism and racialism."

James Callaghan, Secretary of State for Foreign and Commonwealth Affairs and later PM of the United Kingdom, said:

"Krishna Menon was a man of remarkable talents and personality would have shone in any circumstances and at any time but for us he was also the embodiment of the movement within Britain for India's freedom."

An all-party meeting of the members of parliament was held in Central Hall of Parliament to mourn Menon's death. On his funeral, wreaths were placed by president Ahmed, vice-president B. D. Jatti, PM Indira Gandhi and her cabinet members, MPs and also high commissioner for Britain and the Egyptian ambassador. Louis Mountbatten, Jayaprakash Narayan, J. B. Kripalani and other prominent figures also shared their condolences.

== Personal life ==
In private, Menon abstained from tobacco, alcohol and meat, fasting for days, and forwent his luxury townhouse in Kensington Palace Gardens in favour of a single room in the Indian High Commission during his official tenure in London. As high commissioner, Menon drew the token salary of one rupee per month, later refusing a salary outright. Menon dressed publicly in bespoke suits, earning him the epithet "Mephistopheles in a Savile Row suit".

== Awards and honours ==
In 1954, Menon was awarded with the Padma Vibhushan. In 1968, he was awarded with the Syrian Order of Merit by the Syrian President Nureddin al-Atassi. In 2008 he was posthumously awarded with the Order of the Companions of O. R. Tambo.

=== National honours ===
- India:
  - Padma Vibhushan (1954)

=== Foreign honours ===
- Syria:
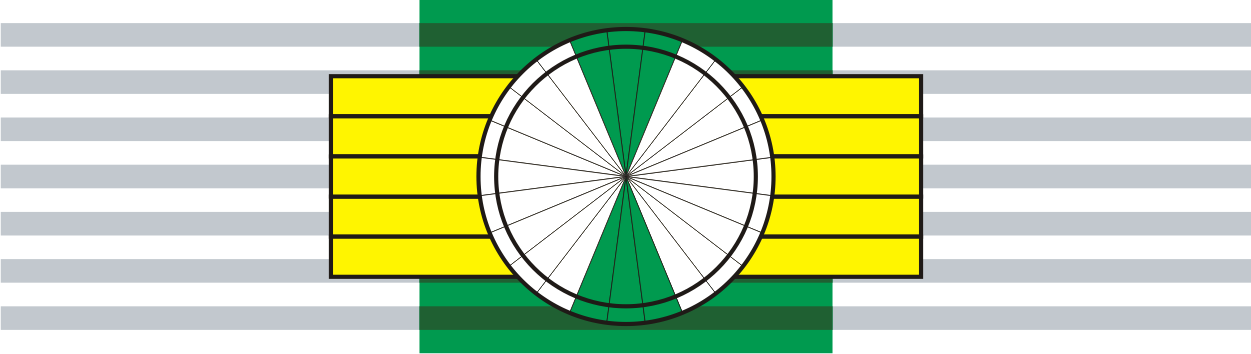
  - Order of Civil Merit of the Syrian Arab Republic, First Class (1968)
- South Africa:
  - Order of the Companions of O. R. Tambo, Grand Companion (2008, posthumous)
- Bangladesh:
  - Bangladesh Liberation War Honour (2013, posthumous)

== Commemoration ==
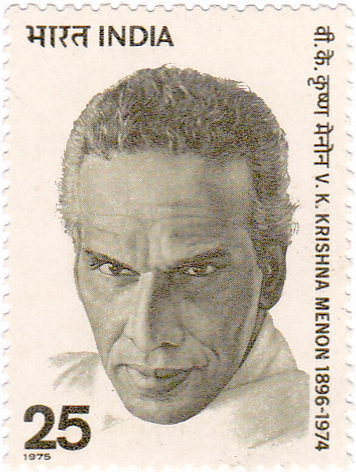
VK Krishna Menon 1975 stamp of India

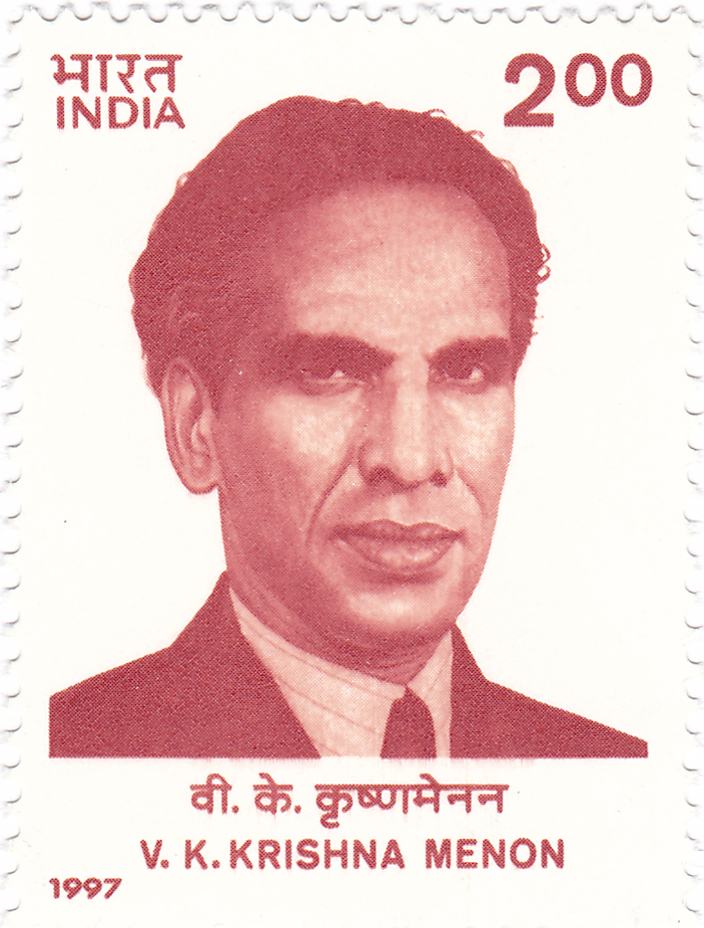
Menon on a 1997 stamp.

The V. K. Krishna Menon Institute was established in 2006 to commemorate and facilitate the life, times and achievements of Menon. One of the Institute's objectives include awarding people from India and diaspora from Asia for their accomplishments in the fields of science, literature, economics, politics, diplomacy and human rights. A blue plaque commemorating Menon was placed at 30 Langdon Park Road, in Highgate, London by English Heritage in 2013.

== Bibliography ==
- Abraham, Itty. "From Bandung to NAM: Non-alignment and Indian Foreign Policy, 1947–1965", Commonwealth & Comparative Politics 46#2 (2008): 195–219.
- Bowman, Jack. "The Early Political Thought and Publishing Career of V. K. Krishna Menon, 1928–1938" The Historical Journal 66 (2023): 641–65. online
- Brecher, Michael. "Elite Images and Foreign Policy Choices: Krishna Menon's View of the World." Pacific Affairs 40.1/2 (1967): 60–92. online
- Brecher, Michael, and Janice Gross Stein. India and world politics: Krishna Menon's view of the world (Praeger, 1968).
- George, T. J. S. (1965). Krishna Menon: A Biography. Taplinger. online free to borrow
- Lengyel, Krishna_Menon (1962) online free
- McGarr, Paul M. "'A Serious Menace to Security': British Intelligence, V.K. Krishna Menon and the Indian High Commission in London, 1947–52." Journal of Imperial and Commonwealth History 38.3 (2010): 441–469.
- McGarr, Paul M. ""India's Rasputin"?: V.K. Krishna Menon and Anglo–American Misperceptions of Indian Foreign Policymaking, 1947–1964." Diplomacy & Statecraft 22.2 (2011): 239–260.
- Janaki Ram, V. K. Krishna Menon: a personal memoir (1997).
- Ramesh, Jairam (2019). A chequered brilliance : the many lives of V.K. Krishna Menon. Haryana, India: Penguin Random House India. ISBN 9780670092321.

Political offices
Preceded by Unknown	Minister for Defence Production	Succeeded by Unknown
Preceded by Kailash Nath Katju	Minister of Defence; 1957–1962	Succeeded by Yashwantrao Chavan
Diplomatic posts
Preceded by M. K. Vellodi (Acting)	High Commissioner of India to the United Kingdom; 1947–1952	Succeeded by B. G. Kher
Preceded by First Holder	Ambassador of India to Republic of Ireland; 1949–1952	Succeeded by B. G. Kher
Rajya Sabha
Preceded by N. Gopalaswami Ayyangar	Member of Parliament from Madras; 1953–1956	Succeeded by Himself as Member from Kerala
Preceded by Himself as Member from Madras State	Member of Parliament from Kerala; 1956–1957	Succeeded by P. J. Thomas
Lok Sabha
Preceded by Vithal Balkrishna Gandhi	Member of Parliament for Bombay City North; 1957–1967	Constituency abolished
Preceded by Sachindra Nath Maity	Member of Parliament for Midnapore; 1969–1971	Succeeded by Subodh Chandra Hansda
Preceded by P. Viswambharan	Member of Parliament for Trivandrum; 1971–1974	Succeeded by M. N. Govindan Nair
