= Dilip Ghosh (politician) =

Indian Politician

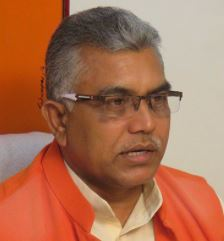

Cabinet Minister, Government of West Bengal
- Incumbent
- Assumed office 9 May 2026
- Governor: R. N. Ravi
- Chief Minister: Suvendu Adhikari
- Departments: Panchayats and Rural Development; Agricultural Marketing; Animal Resources Development

National Vice President of Bharatiya Janata Party
- In office 2021 – 29 July 2023

9th President of Bharatiya Janata Party, West Bengal
- In office 11 December 2015 – 20 September 2021
- National President: Amit Shah; Jagat Prakash Nadda
- Preceded by: Rahul Sinha
- Succeeded by: Sukanta Majumdar

Member of Parliament, Lok Sabha
- In office 23 May 2019 – 5 June 2024
- Preceded by: Sandhya Roy
- Succeeded by: June Malia
- Constituency: Medinipur

Member of West Bengal Legislative Assembly
- Incumbent
- Assumed office 4 May 2026
- Preceded by: Hiran Chatterjee
- Constituency: Kharagpur Sadar
- In office 19 May 2016 – 23 May 2019
- Preceded by: Gyan Singh Sohanpal
- Succeeded by: Pradip Sarkar

Personal details
- Born: 1 August 1964 (age 62) Kuliana, Jhargram, West Bengal, India
- Party: Bharatiya Janata Party
- Other political affiliations: Rashtriya Swayamsevak Sangh (RSS)
- Spouse: Rinku Majumdar (m. 2025)
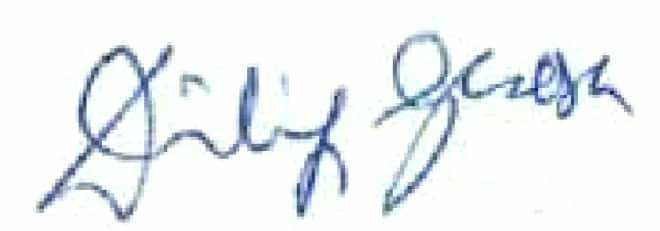
- Signature
- Website: dilipghosh.org
- Nickname: Naru da

Dilip Ghosh (Bengali: [d̪ilip ɡʰoʃ]) (born 1 August 1964) is an Indian politician from West Bengal. He is currently serving as a cabinet minister in the Suvendu Adhikari ministry, Government of West Bengal. He was the Member of Parliament representing the Medinipur constituency in Lok Sabha. He also served as one of the national vice presidents of Bharatiya Janata Party from 2021 to 2023. He served as the 9th president of the West Bengal unit of the Bharatiya Janata Party.

== Early life and education ==
Ghosh was born in Kuliana village near Gopiballavpur of Paschim Medinipur district, West Bengal. He is the second of the four sons of Bholanath Ghosh and Puspalata Ghosh.

After completing his secondary schooling, Ghosh claims to have pursued diploma in engineering from a polytechnic college in Jhargram over an affidavit filed with the Election Commission of India, a case regarding the matter was filed in the Calcutta High Court but the court dismissed it on the grounds that public interest litigation can not be regarding a person's educational qualification. The lone polytechnic institute in the region – Ishwar Chandra Vidyasagar Polytechnic maintains that Ghosh did not pass the diploma from the college between 1975 and 1990.

== Personal life ==
Ghosh comes from the economically backward areas of Jungle Mahals and belongs to the Bengali Sadgop caste. Ghosh is married to Rinku Majumdar, a fellow party leader, in a private ceremony on April 18, 2025.

== Political career ==
Ghosh started his political journey as a volunteer or "Pracharak" of Rashtriya Swayamsevak Sangh (RSS) in 1984. He was the in-charge of RSS in Andaman and Nicobar Islands from 1999 to 2007, and worked as an assistant to former RSS chief K. S. Sudarshan. In 2014, Ghosh was loaned into BJP and was appointed the General Secretary of the West Bengal unit. In 2015, Ghosh was appointed West Bengal State President of the BJP.

Ghosh made his electoral debut in 2016 contesting the West Bengal Legislative Assembly from Kharagpur Sadar. He won in the Kharagpur Sadar constituency of Paschim Medinipur district by defeating his nearest rival Gyan Singh Sohanpal, an Indian National Congress candidate. Gyan Singh Sohanpal of Congress had won the Kharagpur Sadar assembly seat seven times in a row from 1982 to 2011.

In September 2016, Ghosh went for a seven-day trip to the US, to highlight oppression of the Hindus in West Bengal and infiltration of Muslims from Bangladesh; other speakers in the programme were Subramanian Swamy and Hukum Singh. He delivered the lecture to the greater Hindu Community in USA, New Jersey & New York. The program was organized by the US based Hindu Groups.

=== 2019 Indian General Election ===
Under his leadership, in 2019 Lok Sabha election in West Bengal, the Bharatiya Janata Party, without any major political alliance, won 18 Lok Sabha seats out of the 42 constituencies in West Bengal with 40.25% votes. Ghosh himself contested and won the Medinipur Lok Sabha constituency in the 2019 elections by a margin of 88,952 votes and a vote share of 48.62% by defeating Trinamool Congress candidate Manas Bhunia.

He launched a political campaign Chai Pe Charcha where he spoke to people while sipping tea. He made a popular slogan Unishe Half, Ekushe Saaf before the general election. He was attacked on one such campaign on August 30, 2019, in Kolkata's Lake Town area allegedly by Trinamool Congress workers.

In August 2019, Ghosh accompanied Ram Nath Kovind to an official seven-day visit to the African countries of Benin, The Gambia and Guinea as a part of the official Indian delegation.

In January 2020 Dilip Ghosh was re-appointed West Bengal BJP president. Soon after reappointment, he remarked that West Bengal has turned into hub of anti-nationals activities under the governance of Trinamool Congress.

=== 2021 West Bengal Legislative Assembly election ===
Dilip Ghosh did not contest from any MLA seat in the election however he attended and participated in many election campaigns, rallies and political meetings for the BJP candidate from all over the West Bengal. After the election result he raised the incidents for post-poll violence occurred in different parts of West Bengal.

=== 2026 West Bengal Legislative Assembly election ===
Dilip Ghosh contested the 2026 West Bengal Assembly election as the BJP candidate from the Kharagpur Sadar constituency in Paschim Medinipur and retained the seat with a decisive victory over Trinamool Congress candidate Pradip Sarkar by 30,506 votes. According to Election Commission data, Ghosh secured 89,885 votes against Sarkar’s 59,379.

== Controversies ==
He drew criticism when he turned away an ambulance which tried to make way through a rally he was addressing in Nadia, while the ambulance was actually carrying a patient. He claimed that the TMC had done it purposely to disrupt the rally.

=== Statements ===
Dilip Ghosh has made many controversial comments in his several political rallies including name calling people, call for violence like killing and mass murder of political opponents, protestors and to create trouble.

In May 2016, he raised a controversy when he said girl students of Jadavpur University "below standard and shameless who are always in search of opportunity to be in the company of male students". In one of his speeches he criticised "few intellectuals" for having beef on roads and asked them to consume 'dog meat' at their homes. In August 2019, he out of anger due to too much suppression and violence on BJP workers by TMC told that the Trinamul Congress workers' families would be wiped out if he starts killing them . Triggering controversy, he even ordered his party workers rather to take revenge against TMC and even the police through violence. In September 2019, terming the students of Jadavpur University "anti-nationals" and "terrorists", he insinuated that his party would conduct a "Balakot-like surgical strike" on the JU campus to drive out the communists. In November 2019, he stirred up a controversy with his remark stating that foreign cows are aunties, Indian cows produce gold. "The characteristics of Indian cows is that its milk has gold which is why its colour is yellow to some extent. "The Indian cows have hump. But the foreign cows do not have it," he said while addressing a gathering at an event Gopa Ashtami Karyakram organised by him and Gavikalyan Samity at Burdwan. He also courted controversy when he said anti CAA intellectuals are 'devils' and 'parasites' who don't know about their parents.

On 30 January, while addressing a political rally, he commented "Unless you visit jail, you cannot be a political leader". Ghosh made derogatory remarks about Goddess Durga, the most worshipped deity in Bengali Hindu society in an attempt to glorify Lord Rama, the most worshipped deity in North Indian Hindu society. He asked that as everyone knows the names of his ancestors of Lord Ram and does everyone know the same about Durga on 13 February 2021. TMC workers tonsured their heads to protest his statement. He raised questions that why nobody was falling ill or dying at Shaheen Bagh protests, at an event organised by the Kolkata Press Club. On 16 February 2020, he took a jibe on anti Citizenship Amendment Act protesters, and said "some uneducated, unaware, poor people have been lured with money and are being fed Biryani with foreign funds to continue with the protests."

Dilip Ghosh, who is famous for his controversial remarks, made below-the-belt attacks on the incumbent Chief Minister during his election campaign in 2021. Ghosh asked Mamata Banerjee to wear 'Bermudas' in order to display her plastered leg. He later defended his Bermuda remark. He continued to make various other derogatory remarks about the CM during his rallies, questioning her character and lineage. "The police have to work from under our feet," he said in a rally. Ghosh made controversial remarks even about Netaji Subhas Chandra Bose.

=== Lawsuit ===
In January 2020, a lone woman carrying anti CAA poster was heckled by his partyman. Later while speaking to newsmen, Ghosh justified the heckling of the woman saying "Our men did the right thing. She should thank her stars that she was only heckled and nothing else was done to her". Police later registered a sexual harassment case against Ghosh for his remarks.

During the 2021 election campaign, Dilip Ghosh made provocative remarks while Model Code of Conduct was in force, which created grounds for violence. After the election, Kolkata Police lodged FIR against him for promoting enmity.

=== Misinformation regarding COVID-19 ===
In March 2020, he claimed that, there is no harm in drinking cow urine and he has no qualms in admitting he consumes it. The claim that consumption of cow urine can cure coronavirus drew sharp criticism from the ruling Trinamool Congress. In September 2020, Dilip Ghosh declared that the coronavirus pandemic had ended and Chief Minister Mamata Banerjee imposed a lockdown on the state to prevent the BJP party from holding public meetings in a packed rally. Ghosh was tested positive for COVID-19, and was admitted to a private hospital on 16 October 2020. He was later discharged from the hospital on 20 October 2020 after recovering from COVID-19.

== Positions held ==
=== Elected offices ===
Year	Description
May 2019-June 2024	Member of Parliament, Lok Sabha (1st term) – Medinipur
24 July 2019	Member, Committee on Estimates
13 September 2019	Member, Standing Committee on Home Affairs
9 October 2019	Member, Committee of Privileges
	Member, Consultative Committee, Ministry of Skill Development and Entrepreneurship
2016–2019	Member, West Bengal Legislative Assembly (1st term) – Kharagpur
2018–2019	Member, Transport Committee, West Bengal Legislative Assembly; Member, Library Committee, West Bengal Legislative Assembly
2026–present	Member, West Bengal Legislative Assembly (2nd term) – Kharagpur
2026–present	Cabinet Minister, Government of West Bengal; Department of Agricultural Marketing (11 May 2026–present); Department of Panchayats and Rural Development (11 May 2026–present); Department of Animal Resources Development (11 May 2026–present)

=== Political offices ===
Year	Description	Organization
2020–2023	President, West Bengal	BJP
2015–2020	President, West Bengal	BJP
2014–2015	General Secretary, West Bengal	BJP
1999–2007	In-Charge, Andaman and Nicobar Islands	RSS
