= Shyampur Assembly constituency =

Shyampur
- Constituency No. 179 for the West Bengal Legislative Assembly
- Interactive Map Outlining Shyampur Assembly Constituency

Constituency details
- Country: India
- Region: East India
- State: West Bengal
- District: Howrah
- Lok Sabha constituency: Uluberia
- Established: 1951
- Total electors: 208,795
- Reservation: None

Member of Legislative Assembly
- 18th West Bengal Legislative Assembly
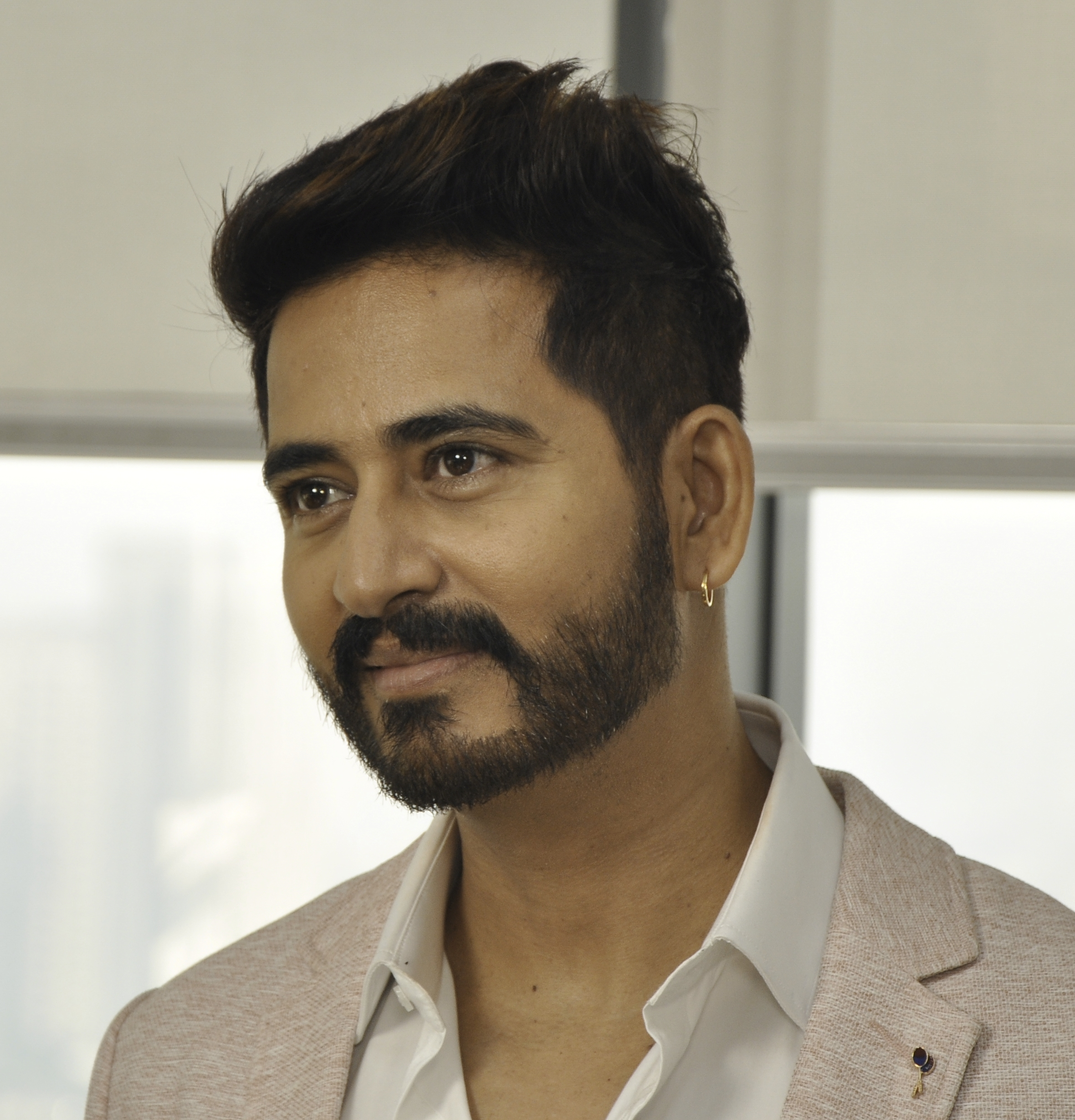
- Incumbent Hiran Chatterjee
- Party: Bharatiya Janata Party
- Elected year: 2026

Shyampur Assembly constituency is an assembly constituency in Howrah district in the Indian state of West Bengal.

== Overview ==
As per orders of the Delimitation Commission, No. 179 Shyampur Assembly constituency is composed of the following: Baneswarpur I, Baneswarpur II, Dingakhola, Kamalpur, Radhapur and Shyampur gram panchayats of Shyampur I community development block and Shyampur II community development block.

Shyampur Assembly constituency is part of No. 26 Uluberia (Lok Sabha constituency).

== Members of the Legislative Assembly ==
Year	Name	Party
1951	Sasabindu Bera	All India Forward Bloc (Marxist)
1957	Sasabindu Bera	All India Forward Bloc (Marxist)
1962	Murari Mohan Manya	Indian National Congress
1967	Sasabindu Bera	All India Forward Bloc
1969	Sasabindu Bera	All India Forward Bloc
1971	Sisir Kumar Sen	Indian National Congress
1972	Sisir Kumar Sen	Indian National Congress
1977	Sasabindu Bera	Janata Party
1982	Gour Hari Adak	All India Forward Bloc
1987	Gour Hari Adak	All India Forward Bloc
1991	Sanjib Kumar Das	Indian National Congress
1996	Sanjib Kumar Das	Indian National Congress
2001	Kalipada Mandal	Trinamool Congress
2006	Kalipada Mandal	Trinamool Congress
2011	Kalipada Mandal	Trinamool Congress
2016	Kalipada Mandal	Trinamool Congress
2021	Kalipada Mandal	Trinamool Congress
2026	Hiran Chatterjee	Bharatiya Janata Party

== Election results ==
=== 2026 ===
2026 West Bengal Legislative Assembly election: Shyampur
Party	Candidate	Votes	%	±%
BJP	Hiran Chatterjee	125,651	51.36	+13.82
AITC	Nadebasi Jana	103,391	42.26	−9.48
AIFB	Asit Baran Sau	8,713	3.56	
NOTA	None of the above	1,093	0.45	−0.06
Majority		22,260	9.1	−5.1
Turnout		244,669	94.31	+8.17
BJP gain from AITC		Swing		

=== 2021 ===
West Bengal assembly elections, 2021: Shyampur
Party	Candidate	Votes	%	±%
AITC	Kalipada Mandal	114,804	51.74	
BJP	Tanusree Chakraborty	83,293	37.54	
INC	Amitava Chakraborty	20,408	9.2	
NOTA	None of the above	1,142	0.51	
Majority		31,511	14.2	
Turnout		221,889	86.14	

=== 2011 ===
West Bengal assembly elections, 2011: Shyampur constituency
Party	Candidate	Votes	%	±%
AITC	Kalipada Mondal	99,501	56.64	+7.74#
AIFB	Minati Pramanik	64,882	36.94	−6.74
BJP	Gour Mohan Das	7,297	4.15	
People’s Democratic Conference of India	Aynul Molla	3,978		
Turnout		175,658	84.13	
AITC hold		Swing	13.51#	

.# Swing calculated on Congress+Trinamool Congress vote percentages taken together in 2006.

=== 2006 ===
In 2006 and 2001 state assembly elections, Kali Pada Mandal of Trinamool Congress won the Shyampur assembly seat defeating his nearest rivals Asit Baran Sau and Jaladhar Samanta, both of Forward Bloc, respectively. Contests in most years were multi cornered but only winners and runners are being mentioned. Sanjib Kumar Das of Congress defeated Jaladhar Samanta and Gour Hari Adak, both of Forward Bloc, in 1996 and 1991 respectively. Gour Hari Adak of Forward Bloc defeated Sisir Kumar Sen of Congress in 1987 and 1982. Sasabindu Bera of Janata Party defeated Kishori Mohan Moinan of Forward Bloc in 1977.

=== 1972 ===
Sisir Kumar Sen of Congress won in 1972 and 1971. Sasabindu Bera representing Forward Bloc won in 1969 and !967. Murari Mohan Manya of Congress won in 1962. Sasabindu Bera representing Forward Bloc (Marxists) won in 1957. In independent India's first election in 1951, Sasabindu Bera representing Forward Bloc (Marxist Group) won the Shyampur seat.
