= Hiran Chatterjee =

Indian actor and politician (born 1976)

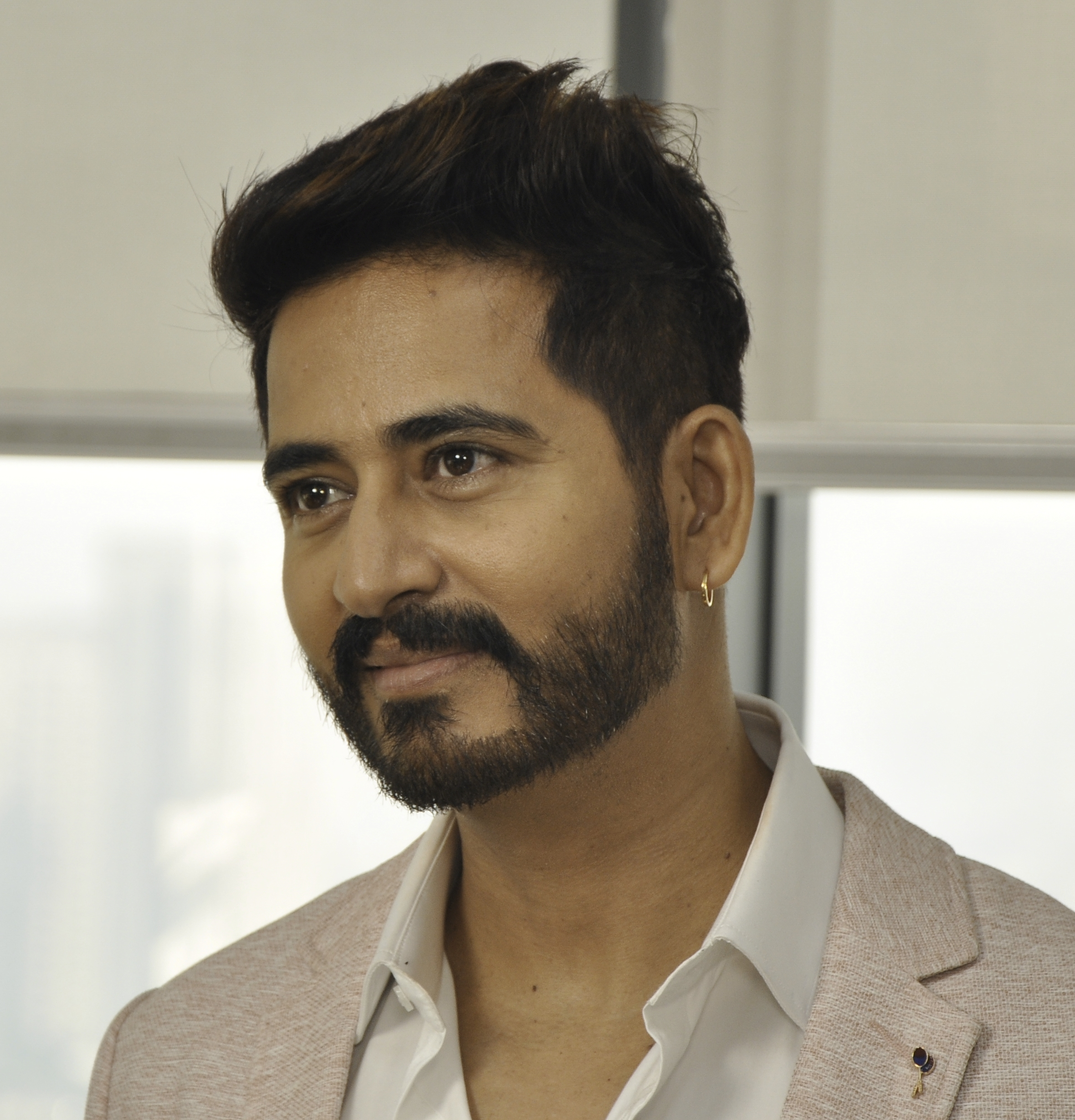
- Chatterjee in 2019

Member of the West Bengal Legislative Assembly
- Incumbent
- Assumed office 4 May 2026
- Preceded by: Kalipada Mandal
- Constituency: Shyampur
- In office 2 May 2021 – 4 May 2026
- Preceded by: Pradip Sarkar
- Succeeded by: Dilip Ghosh
- Constituency: Kharagpur Sadar

Councillor in Kharagpur Municipality
- Incumbent
- Assumed office 2022
- Constituency: Ward no. 33

Personal details
- Born: Hiranmoy Chattopadhyay; 19 December 1985 (age 40) Uluberia, West Bengal, India
- Party: Bharatiya Janata Party (2021–present)
- Children: 1
- Occupation: Actor
- Years active: 2007–present

Hiran Chatterjee (born Hiranmoy Chattopadhyay, 19 December 1985) is an Indian actor and politician who has served as the Member of the West Bengal Legislative Assembly for Kharagpur Sadar since 2021. A member of the Bharatiya Janata Party (BJP), he is also associated with Voice of World, a Kolkata-based non-governmental organisation that supports visually impaired, disabled, and orphaned children from underprivileged backgrounds.

== Early life and education ==
Hiran Chatterjee was a resident of Uluberia, a sub-divisional town in Howrah district, West Bengal, where he spent his childhood. He began his professional career as a Senior Manager at Reliance Industries in Mumbai.

== Political career ==
Hiran was elected as a member of the West Bengal Legislative Assembly from the Kharagpur Sadar constituency. He defeated Pradip Sarkar of the Trinamool Congress by 3,771 votes in the 2021 West Bengal Assembly election. Later, he was elected as a councillor for Ward 33 of Kharagpur Municipality in the West Bengal Municipal Elections, 2022.

== Awards ==
Hiran received the Best Action Hero Award from Anandalok for his role in Nabab Nandini in 2008.

== Filmography ==
Year	Film	Role	Notes	Ref
2007	Nawab Nandini	Nabab	Debut film	
2008	Bhalobasa Bhalobasa	Siddhartha / Sidhu		
2008	Chirosathi	Raju		
2009	Jackpot	Arko		
2009	Maa Amar Maa	Surjo		
2009	Olot Palot	Rohan		
2009	Risk	Rony		
2010	Mon Je Kore Uru Uru	Rahul		
2012	Macho Mastanaa	Nabab	Also storywriter	
2012	Le Halua Le	Suvojeet / Suvo		
2013	Misti Cheler Dustu Buddhi	Himself	Special appearance	
2013	Majnu	Avik		
2015	Jamai 420	Bijoy		
2017	Meher Aali	Meher Aali		
2017	Jio Pagla	Ananda		
2018	Hoichoi Unlimited	Hiran	Special appearance	
2019	Jamai Badal	Gunjan		
2019	Thai Curry	Shamya		
2020	Jio Jamai	Aditya		
2026	Chaddyabeshi	Shankar Singha		
