= Kharagpur Assembly constituency =

Vidhan Sabha Constituency in West Bengal, India

Kharagpur
- Constituency No. 228 for the West Bengal Legislative Assembly
- Interactive Map Outlining Kharagpur Assembly Constituency

Constituency details
- Country: India
- Region: East India
- State: West Bengal
- District: Paschim Medinipur
- Lok Sabha constituency: Medinipur
- Established: 1951
- Total electors: 166,811
- Reservation: None

Member of Legislative Assembly
- 18th West Bengal Legislative Assembly
- Incumbent Dinen Roy
- Party: Democratic Trinamool Congress
- Elected year: 2026

Kharagpur Assembly constituency (formerly Kharagpur Rural) is an assembly constituency in Paschim Medinipur district in the Indian state of West Bengal.

== Overview ==
As per orders of the Delimitation Commission, No. 228 Kharagpur Assembly constituency is composed of the following: Kharagpur I community development block, and Banpura, Panchkhuri I, Panchkhuri II, Pathra and Shiromoni gram panchayats of Midnapore Sadar community development block.

Kharagpur Assembly constituency is part of No. 34 Medinipur (Lok Sabha constituency).

== Members of the Legislative Assembly ==
Year	Name	Party
1952	Moulana Muhammad Momtaz	Indian National Congress
1957	Krishna Prasad Jana	Indian National Congress
1957	Mrityunjoy Jana	Indian National Congress
1962	Mrityunjoy Jana	Indian National Congress
1967	Deben Das	Communist Party of India
1969	Deben Das	Communist Party of India
1971	Ajit Kumar Basu	Indian National Congress
1972	Ajit Kumar Basu	Indian National Congress
1977	Sheikh Siraj Ali	Communist Party of India
1982	Sheikh Siraj Ali	Communist Party of India
1987	Sheikh Najmul Haque	Communist Party of India
1991	Sheikh Najmul Haque	Communist Party of India
1996	Sheikh Najmul Haque	Communist Party of India
2001	Sheikh Najmul Haque	Communist Party of India
2006	Sheikh Najmul Haque	Communist Party of India
2011	Sheikh Najmul Haque	Communist Party of India
2016	Dinen Roy	Trinamool Congress
2021	Dinen Roy	Trinamool Congress
2026	Dinen Roy	Trinamool Congress

== Election results ==
=== 2026 ===
2026 West Bengal Legislative Assembly election: Kharagpur
Party	Candidate	Votes	%	±%
AITC	Dinen Roy	98,320	47.14	▼7.71
BJP	Tapan Bhuya	95,448	45.77	▲9.03
CPI(M)	Sk Sajahan Ali	7,951	3.81	▼1.81
NOTA	None of the above	1,535	0.74	▼0.42
Majority		2,872	1.37	▼16.74
Turnout		208,560	95.44	▲7.35
AITC hold		Swing		

=== 2021 ===
2021 West Bengal Legislative Assembly election: Kharagpur
Party	Candidate	Votes	%	±%
AITC	Dinen Roy	109,727	54.85	
BJP	Tapan Bhuya	73,497	36.74	
CPI(M)	Syed Saddam Ali	11,245	5.62	
NOTA	None of the above	2,314	1.16	
Majority		36,230	18.11	
Turnout		200,044	88.09	
AITC hold		Swing		

=== 2016 ===
2016 West Bengal Legislative Assembly election: Kharagpur
Party	Candidate	Votes	%	±%
AITC	Dinen Roy	85,630	48.43	
CPI(M)	Sk Sajahan Ali	66,531	37.63	
BJP	Goutam Bhattacharjee	17,722	10.02	
NOTA	None of the above	2,461	1.39	
SUCI(C)	Manik Chandra Poria	2,402	1.36	
Majority		19,099	10.80	
Turnout		1,77,124	88.94	
AITC gain from CPI(M)		Swing		

=== 2011 ===
2011 West Bengal Legislative Assembly election: Kharagpur
Party	Candidate	Votes	%	±%
CPI(M)	Sheikh Najmul Haque	70,178	46.78	−7.18
AITC	Bilkis Khanam	67,674	45.11	+3.38#
IND	Shuba Raj	4,092	2.73	
BJP	Prabir Kumar Sahu	3,648	2.43	
PDS	Balaram Pal	2,074	1.38	
Majority		2,504	1.67	
Turnout		1,50,153	89.96	
CPI(M) hold		Swing	-9.56#	

.# Swing calculated on Congress+Trinamool Congress vote percentages taken together in 2006.

=== 2006 ===
Sheikh Najmul Haque of CPI(M) won the Kharagpur Rural assembly seat five times in a row from 1987 to 2006. He defeated Ajit Maity of Trinamool Congress in 2006 and 2001, Ranjit Basu of Congress in 1996, Nirmal Ghosh of Congress in 1991 and Ranjit Basu of Congress in 1987. Sheikh Siraj Ali of CPI(M) defeated Deben Das, Independent, in 1982 Deben Das of CPI in 1977. Contests in most years were multi cornered but only winners and runners are being mentioned.

=== 1972 ===
Between 1957 and 1972 the seat was known as Kharagpur Local. Ajit Kumar Basu of Congress won in 1972 and 1971. Deben Das of CPI won in 1969 and 1967. Mrityunjoy Jana of Congress won in 1962. Kharagpur Local was a dual seat in 1957. It was won by Krishna Prasad Mondal and Mrityunjoy Jana, both of Congress. In independent India's first election in 1951, Kharagpur had a single seat, which was won by Moulana Muhammad Momtaz of Congress.
