= Gyan Singh Sohanpal =

Indian politician

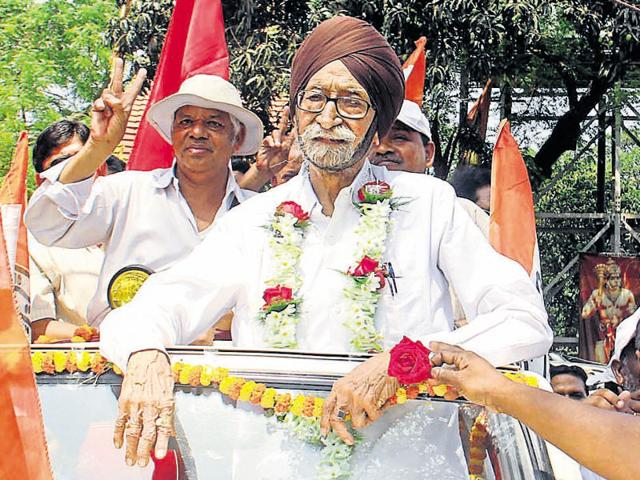

Pro tem Speaker of the West Bengal Legislative Assembly
- In office May 18, 2011 – May 30, 2011
- Governor: M. K. Narayanan
- Preceded by: Hashim Abdul Halim
- Succeeded by: Biman Banerjee
- Constituency: Kharagpur Sadar

Member of the West Bengal Legislative Assembly
- In office 1969–1977
- Preceded by: Narayan Choubey
- Constituency: Kharagpur Sadar
- In office 1982–2016
- Preceded by: Sudhir Das Sharma
- Succeeded by: Dilip Ghosh
- Constituency: Kharagpur Sadar

Minister of Small Industries and Jails Government of West Bengal
- In office February 25, 1969 – July 30, 1970
- Governor: Shanti Swaroop Dhavan
- Chief Minister: Ajoy Mukherjee

Minister for Transport, Jail and Parliamentary Affairs Government of West Bengal
- In office March 19, 1972 – June 21, 1977
- Governor: Anthony Lancelot Dias
- Chief Minister: Siddhartha Shankar Ray

Personal details
- Born: Gyan Singh Sohanpal; 11 January 1925
- Died: 8 August 2017 (aged 92)
- Party: Indian National Congress
- Education: Midnapore Collegiate School

Gyan Singh Sohanpal (11 January 1925 – 8 August 2017), was an Indian politician affiliated with the Indian National Congress and a member of the West Bengal Legislative Assembly. He is affectionately known as Chacha Ji ("Uncle" in English) in his constituency of Kharagpur Sadar.

He won his seat Kharagpur Sadar in 1969, 1971, 1972, 1982, 1987, 1991, 1996, 2001, 2006 and 2011.

Since 1969, he only lost elections in 1977 and 2016 when he was 91 years old.

He was MLA for 10 terms.

He contested his first election in 1962 and became a minister in 1969 in Ajoy Mukherjee’s cabinet, taking charge of Small Industries and Jails. In Siddhartha Shankar Ray’s cabinet, he was the Minister for Transport, Jail and Parliamentary Affairs. He has represented Kharagpur since 1982, and in the 2011 election, he defeated Anil Kumar Das of the CPI(M) by over 32,000 votes. Following that election, he was the most senior Member of the Legislative Assembly of West Bengal and served briefly as Speaker of the Legislative Assembly. He was sworn in as the Speaker by Governor M. K. Narayanan on May 18, 2011.
