= Jio Jamai =

2020 Indian Bengali film

- Directed by: Nehal Dutta
- Produced by: Joydeb Mondal
- Starring: Hiran Chatterjee; Ishani Ghosh
- Edited by: Malay Laha
- Music by: Dev Sen
- Production company: Jyoti Production
- Release date: 10 January 2020
- Running time: 121 minutes
- Country: India
- Language: Bengali
- Box office: ₹0.5 crore (equivalent to ₹5.9 million or US$61,000 in 2023)

Jio Jamai is a Bengali romance comedy film directed by Nehal Dutta and produced by Joydeb Mondal. The film was released on 10 January 2020 under the banner of Jyoti Production.

== Plot ==
Diya works in Jyotirani Devi's Company in Vizag, where all the employees are female. Jyotirani's daughter, Premarati appoints a man, Aditya as regional head of the company. Aditya falls in love with his colleague Diya. One day Aditya realises that Diya's parents are not going through a happy marriage even after being together for 25 years. This also troubles the relationship between Diya and Aditya. To save the relationship of Diya's parents, the couple decides to act in a different manner. It leads to a series laughter when Adi's uncle comes Vizag.

== Cast ==
- Hiran Chatterjee as Aditya
- Ishani Ghosh as Diya
- Biswajit Chakraborty
- Rajatava Dutta as Diya's father
- Tulika Basu as Diya's mother
- Moumita Chakraborty
- Sumit Ganguly

== Soundtrack ==
Jio Jamai

Soundtrack album by Dev Sen
- Released: 30 December 2019
- Genre: Film soundtrack
- Length: 10:13
- Language: Bengali
- Label: Zee Music Bangla

Official audio
- Jio Jamai - Full Album on YouTube

Track listing
No.	Title	Singer(s)	Length
1.	"Chhoya Chhuyi"	Armaan Malik, Debanjali B Joshi	3:28
2.	"Aye Phire Aye"	Palak Muchhal, Rayan Roy	3:55
3.	"Jio Jamai (Title Track)"	Rayan Roy, Sirsshhaa Rakshit	2:50
Total length:			10:13
