= Rama Prasad Giri =

Indian politician (born 1975)

Member of the West Bengal Legislative Assembly
- Incumbent
- Assumed office 4 May 2026
- Preceded by: Surja Kanta Atta
- Constituency: Narayangarh

Personal details
- Party: Bharatiya Janata Party
- Profession: Politician

Rama Prasad Giri (born 1975) is an Indian politician from West Bengal. He is a member of the West Bengal Legislative Assembly from the Narayangarh Assembly constituency in Paschim Medinipur district representing the Bharatiya Janata Party.

== Early life and education ==
Ramaprasad is from Narayangarh, Paschim Medinipur district, West Bengal. He is the son of the late Sunil Baran Giri. He completed his BA at a college affiliated with the University of Calcutta in 1998 and did a diploma in Elementary Education in 2018 and passed the examinations conducted by the West Bengal Board of Primary Education. He and his wife are primary school teachers. He declared assets worth Rs.91 lakhs in his affidavit to the Election Commission of India.

== Career ==
Ramaprasad won the Narayangarh Assembly constituency representing the Bharatiya Janata Party in the 2026 West Bengal Legislative Assembly election. He polled 1,16,050 votes and defeated his nearest rival, Pratibha Maiti of the All India Trinamool Congress by a margin of 20,367 votes. Earlier in the 2021 West Bengal Legislative Assembly election, he lost to Atta Surja Kanta of the All India Trinamool Congress by a margin of 2,416 votes.
