= Pradip Sarkar (West Bengal politician) =

Indian politician

Chairman of Kharagpur Municipality
- In office June 2015 – May 2020
- In office March 2022 – December 2022

Member of West Bengal Legislative Assembly
- In office 28 November 2019 – 2 May 2021
- Preceded by: Dilip Ghosh
- Succeeded by: Hiran Chatterjee
- Constituency: Kharagpur Sadar

Personal details
- Born: March 1, 1972 (age 54) Kharagpur, West Bengal, India
- Party: Trinamool Congress
- Spouse: Papiya Sarkar
- Children: Ashmita Sarkar
- Education: Vidyasagar University
- Occupation: Businessperson, Politician

Pradip Sarkar is a politician from West Bengal belonging to Trinamool Congress. He was a member of the West Bengal Legislative Assembly.

== Biography ==
Sarkar graduated from Vidyasagar University in 1993. He was elected as the chairman of Kharagpur Municipality. He was elected as a member of the West Bengal Legislative Assembly from Kharagpur Sadar on 28 November 2019. This was the first win for any Trinamool Congress candidate from Kharagpur Sadar.
