= Sheikh Siraj Ali =

West Bengal politician

Member of West Bengal Legislative Assembly
- In office 1977–1987
- Preceded by: Constituency established
- Succeeded by: Sheikh Najmul Haque
- Constituency: Kharagpur Rural

Personal details
- Born: Kharagpur, Midnapore district, Bengal Presidency
- Party: Communist Party of India (Marxist)

Sheikh Siraj Ali was an Indian politician belonging to the Communist Party of India (Marxist). He was a four-time member of the West Bengal Legislative Assembly.

== Early life ==
Ali was born into a Bengali family of Muslim Sheikhs in Kharagpur, Midnapore district, Bengal Presidency.

== Career ==
He contested in the 1971 West Bengal Legislative Assembly election where he ran as a Communist Party of India (Marxist) candidate for Kharagpur Local Assembly constituency, but lost to Congress politician Ajit Kumar Basu. In the 1972 West Bengal Legislative Assembly election, Ali lost to Basu once again. In the 1977 West Bengal Legislative Assembly election, Ali was elected to the new Kharagpur Rural constituency. In the 1982 West Bengal Legislative Assembly election, he was re-elected to Kharagpur Rural after defeating Deben Das.
