= Bhadra Hemram =

Indian politician

Member of the West Bengal Legislative Assembly
- Incumbent
- Assumed office 4 May 2026
- Preceded by: Paresh Murmu
- Constituency: Keshiary (ST)

Personal details
- Party: Bharatiya Janata Party
- Profession: Politician

Bhadra Hemram or Bhadra Hembram is an Indian politician and member of the Bharatiya Janata Party. He was elected as a Member of the West Bengal Legislative Assembly from the Keshiary (ST) constituency in the 2026 West Bengal Legislative Assembly election.
