= Keshiary Assembly constituency =

Keshiary
- Constituency No. 223 for the West Bengal Legislative Assembly
- Interactive Map Outlining Keshiary Assembly Constituency

Constituency details
- Country: India
- Region: East India
- State: West Bengal
- District: Paschim Medinipur
- Lok Sabha constituency: Medinipur
- Established: 1967
- Total electors: 182,596
- Reservation: ST

Member of Legislative Assembly
- 18th West Bengal Legislative Assembly
- Incumbent Bhadra Hemram
- Party: BJP
- Alliance: NDA
- Elected year: 2026

Keshiary is an assembly constituency in Paschim Medinipur district in the Indian state of West Bengal. It is reserved for scheduled tribes.

== Overview ==
As per orders of the Delimitation Commission, No. 223 Keshiary Assembly constituency (ST) is composed of the following: Keshiari community development block, and Alikosha, Angua, Anikola, Dantan I, Dantan II, Monoharpur, Salikotha and Tararui gram panchayats of Dantan I community development block.

Keshiary Assembly constituency is part of No. 34 Medinipur (Lok Sabha constituency).

== Members of the Legislative Assembly ==
Year	Name	Party
1967	Budhan Chandra Tudu	Indian National Congress
1969	Budhan Chandra Tudu	Indian National Congress
1971	Budhan Chandra Tudu	Indian National Congress
1972	Budhan Chandra Tudu	Indian National Congress
1977	Khudiram Singh	Communist Party of India
1982	Maheswar Murmu	Communist Party of India
1987	Maheswar Murmu	Communist Party of India
1991	Maheswar Murmu	Communist Party of India
1996	Maheswar Murmu	Communist Party of India
2001	Maheswar Murmu	Communist Party of India
2006	Maheswar Murmu	Communist Party of India
2011	Biram Mandi	Communist Party of India
2016	Paresh Murmu	All India Trinamool Congress
2021	Paresh Murmu	All India Trinamool Congress
2026	Bhadra Hemram	Bharatiya Janata Party

== Election results ==
=== 2026 ===
2026 West Bengal Legislative Assembly election: Keshiary
Party	Candidate	Votes	%	±%
BJP	Bhadra Hemram	113,713	50.8	+8.0
AITC	Ramjiban Mandi	97,826	43.7	−6.31
CPI(M)	Malina Murmu	6,248	2.79	−1.57
NOTA	None of the above	1,338	0.6	−0.61
Majority		15,887	7.1	−0.11
Turnout		223,842	93.71	+4.66
BJP gain from AITC		Swing		

=== 2021 ===
2021 West Bengal Legislative Assembly election: Keshiary
Party	Candidate	Votes	%	±%
AITC	Paresh Murmu	106,366	50.01	
BJP	Sonali Murmu	91,036	42.8	
CPI(M)	Pulin Bihari Baske	9,270	4.36	
NOTA	None of the above	2,570	1.21	
Majority		15,330	7.21	
Turnout		212,681	89.05	
AITC hold		Swing		

=== 2016 ===
West Bengal assembly elections, 2016: Keshiary (ST) constituency
Party	Candidate	Votes	%	±%
AITC	Paresh Murmu	104,890	53.99	+8.64
CPI(M)	Biram Mandi	64,141	33.02	−12.95
BJP	Binod Bihari Murmu	18,056	9.29	
NOTA	None of the above	3,041	1.57	
SUCI(C)	Shyamsundar Singh	1,917	0.99	
Independent	Balai Chandra Nayek	1,426	0.73	
Independent	Gopen Sing	789	0.41	
Turnout		194,260	89.37	−2.33
AITC gain from CPI(M)		Swing		

=== 2011 ===
2011 West Bengal state assembly election: Keshiary
Party	Candidate	Votes	%	±%
CPI(M)	Biram Mandi	76,976	45.97	−17.49
AITC	Shyam Charan Mandi	75,939	45.35	+12.11#
BJP	Dilip Routh	6,651		
Independent	Jaba Hansda	5,418		
JMM	Gopal Murmu	2,453		
Turnout		167,437	91.7	
CPI(M) hold		Swing	-29.60#	

.# Swing calculated on Congress+Trinamool Congress vote percentages taken together in 2006.

=== 2006 ===
Maheswar Murmu of CPI(M) won the Keshiary assembly seat (ST) six times in a row from 1982 to 2006, defeating Shyam Charan Mandi of Trinamool Congress in 2006 and 2001. Contests in most years were multi cornered but only winners and runners are being mentioned. Gouri Tudu of Congress in 1996, Rekha Kishu of Congress in 1991, Budhan Chandra Tudu of Congress in 1987 and 1982. Khudiram Singh of CPI(M) defeated Budhan Chandra Tudu of Congress in 1977.

=== 1972 ===
Budhan Chandra Tudu of Congress won in 1972, 1971, 1969 and 1967. Prior to that the Keshiary seat did not exist.
