= Jeep scandal case =

1948 defence procurement case in India

The jeep scandal case took place in 1948 when V. K. Krishna Menon, the Indian High Commissioner to the United Kingdom, ignored protocols and signed a Rs 80 lakh contract for the purchase of army jeeps with a foreign firm.

The deal was later cancelled by the Indian Deputy High Commissioner in London due to the failure of the completion of the order. The investigation into the matter was closed in 1955 after nothing was found against anybody including Menon.

== Purchase ==
With the Indo-Pakistani War of 1947–1948 ongoing, the Indian Army required more jeeps against the Pakistani Army. V. K. Krishna Menon, the Indian High Commissioner to Britain, placed an order for 2,000 refurbished Jeeps for the same price of new Jeeps that could be purchased from the United States or Canada. He argued that they would be delivered immediately with spare parts. The company assigned to deliver the Jeeps, the little-known Anti-Mistantes, had a capital of only £605. Krishna Menon agreed to pay $172,000, with 65% of the total payment upfront without any inspection certificate. He also agreed that only 10% of the Jeeps would be inspected. The earlier contract stipulated that 65% of the payment would be made upon inspection, 20% on delivery and the rest a month after delivery. Of the 155 Jeeps that arrived, none could be placed into service. The Defence Ministry refused to accept them, and Anti-Mistantes suspended delivery of the Jeeps. Menon, unable to contact it, entered an agreement with S.C.K. Agencies for 1,007 jeeps, with 68 being delivered monthly and the Indian government to be compensated for its loss from the older contract. Each jeep cost £458.10 while Anti-Mistantes sold a jeep for £300. Menon agreed to change the contract to stipulate that 12 jeeps would be delivered monthly for six months and then 120 jeeps would be delivered monthly. The company, however, supplied only 49 jeeps in two years and refused to compensate the government. The payment of the jeeps by Britain was part of the British war debt to India dating back to the Second World War.

== Investigation ==
Menon bypassed protocol to sign a deal worth Rs. 80 lakh to the foreign firm for the purchase of the jeeps.

On 30 September 1955 the investigation into the matter was closed after nothing was found against anybody including Menon. Soon afterward, on 3 February 1956, Menon was inducted into the Nehru cabinet as minister without portfolio. Later, Menon became Prime Minister Jawaharlal Nehru's trusted ally as defence minister.
