= Kalipada Mandal =

Indian politician

Member of the West Bengal Legislative Assembly
- In office 13 May 2001 – 4 May 2026
- Preceded by: Sanjib Kumar Das
- Succeeded by: Hiran Chatterjee
- Constituency: Shyampur

Personal details
- Born: May 12, 1944 (age 82)
- Party: Trinamool Congress
- Profession: Politician

Kalipada Mandal is an Indian politician member of All India Trinamool Congress. He is an MLA, elected from the Shyampur constituency in the 2001 West Bengal Legislative Assembly election. In 2006, 2011, 2016 and 2021 assembly election he was re-elected from the same constituency.
