= Prabodh Panda =

Indian politician

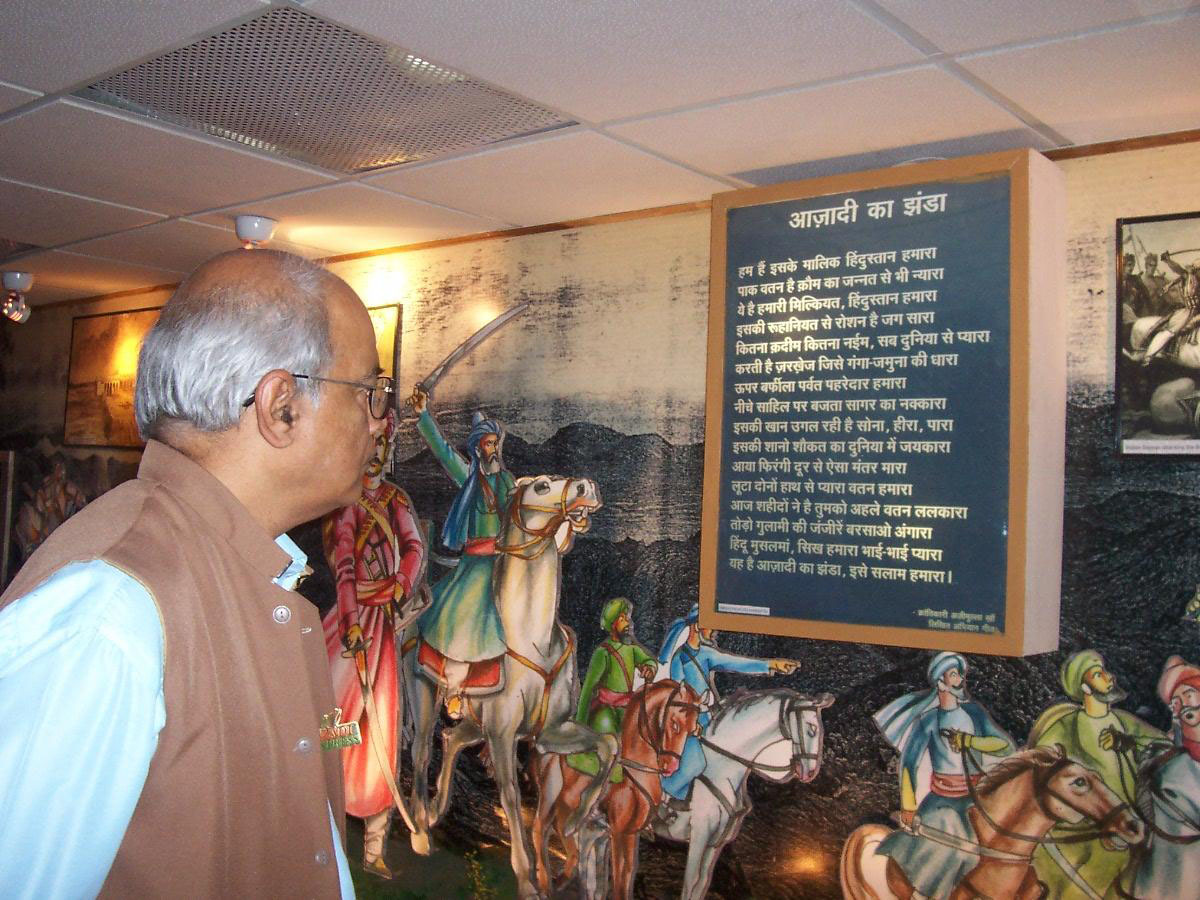
- The Member of Parliament, Medinipur, Shri Prabodh Panda taking round at an exhibition in West Bengal on 6 March 2008.

Member of the Indian Parliament for Midnapore
- In office 2001–2014
- Preceded by: Indrajit Gupta
- Succeeded by: Sandhya Roy
- Constituency: Midnapore

CPI West Bengal State Secretary
- In office February 2015 – February 2018
- Preceded by: Manju Kumar Majumdar
- Succeeded by: Swapan Banerjee

Personal details
- Born: 7 February 1946 Midnapore, West Bengal
- Died: 27 February 2018 (aged 72) Kolkata, West Bengal, India
- Party: Communist Party of India
- As of 17 September, 2006 Source: Detailed Profile: Shri Prabodh Panda

Prabodh Panda (7 February 1946 – 27 February 2018) was an Indian politician. He was a leader of the Communist Party of India. He was elected to the 13th Lok Sabha from Midnapore constituency in West Bengal in a by-election held on 10 May 2001. He was re-elected to the Lok Sabha in 2004 and 2009 from the same constituency.

== Personal life ==
Panda was born in a Utkal Brahmin family. His father was Devendra Nath Panda and mother Niradabala Panda. He graduated in arts from the Dantan Bhattar College, which was then affiliated with the prestigious and historic University of Calcutta. After serving the Lok Sabha office as a Member of Parliament for 13 years, he has been the secretary of state for West Bengal for the Communist Party of India since February 2015. He died on 27 February 2018 following a massive heart attack while working at his office in Kolkata.
