= Narayangarh Assembly constituency =

Narayangarh
- Constituency No. 225 for the West Bengal Legislative Assembly
- Interactive Map Outlining Narayangarh Assembly Constituency

Constituency details
- Country: India
- Region: East India
- State: West Bengal
- District: Paschim Medinipur
- Lok Sabha constituency: Medinipur
- Established: 1951
- Total electors: 191,705
- Reservation: None

Member of Legislative Assembly
- 18th West Bengal Legislative Assembly
- Incumbent Rama Prasad Giri
- Party: BJP
- Alliance: NDA
- Elected year: 2026

Narayangarh Assembly constituency is an assembly constituency in Paschim Medinipur district in the Indian state of West Bengal.

== Overview ==
As per orders of the Delimitation Commission, No. 225 Narayangarh Assembly constituency is composed of the following: Narayangarh community development block.

Narayangarh Assembly constituency is part of No. 34 Medinipur (Lok Sabha constituency).

== Members of the Legislative Assembly ==
| Year | Name | Party |
|---|---|---|
| 1951 | Surendranath Pramanik | Kisan Mazdoor Praja Party |
| 1951 | Krishna Chandra Satpati | Bharatiya Jana Sangh |
| 1957 | No Seat | |
| 1962 | Krishna Prasad Mondal | Indian National Congress |
| 1967 | K. D. Roy | Indian National Congress |
| 1969 | Mihir Kumar Laha | Bangla Congress |
| 1971 | Braja Kishore Maity | Independent politician |
| 1972 | Braja Kishore Maity | Indian National Congress |
| 1977 | Krishna Das Roy | Indian National Congress |
| 1982 | Bibhuti Bhusan De | Communist Party of India (Marxist) |
| 1987 | Bibhuti Bhusan De | Communist Party of India (Marxist) |
| 1991 | Dr. Surjya Kanta Mishra | Communist Party of India (Marxist) |
| 1996 | Dr. Surjya Kanta Mishra | Communist Party of India (Marxist) |
| 2001 | Dr. Surjya Kanta Mishra | Communist Party of India (Marxist) |
| 2006 | Dr. Surjya Kanta Mishra | Communist Party of India (Marxist) |
| 2011 | Dr. Surjya Kanta Mishra | Communist Party of India (Marxist) |
| 2016 | Prodyut Kumar Ghosh | Trinamool Congress |
| 2021 | Surja Kanta Atta | Trinamool Congress |
| 2026 | Rama Prasad Giri | Bharatiya Janata Party |

== Election results ==
=== 2026 ===
2026 West Bengal Legislative Assembly election: Narayangarh
| Party | Candidate | Votes | % | ±% |
|---|---|---|---|---|
| BJP | Rama Prasad Giri | 116,050 | 51.45 | +6.22 |
| AITC | Pratibha Maiti | 95,683 | 42.42 | −3.91 |
| CPI(M) | Tapas Sinha | 7,345 | 3.26 | −2.82 |
| NOTA | None of the above | 1,651 | 0.73 | −0.08 |
| Majority | | 20,367 | 9.03 | +7.93 |
| Turnout | | 225,543 | 94.22 | +4.92 |
| BJP gain from AITC | | Swing | | |

=== 2021 ===
West Bengal assembly elections, 2021: Narayangarh
| Party | Candidate | Votes | % | ±% |
|---|---|---|---|---|
| AITC | Atta Surja Kanta | 100,894 | 46.33 | |
| BJP | Rama Prasad Giri | 98,478 | 45.23 | |
| CPI(M) | Tapas Sinha | 13,229 | 6.08 | |
| SUCI(C) | Shyama Pada Jana | 2,833 | 1.3 | |
| NOTA | None of the above | 1,756 | 0.81 | |
| Majority | | 2,416 | 1.1 | |
| Turnout | | 217,750 | 89.3 | |
| AITC hold | | Swing | | |

=== 2016 ===
In the 2016 elections, Prodyut Kumar Ghosh of Trinamool Congress defeated his nearest rival Dr. Surjya Kanta Mishra of CPI(M).

West Bengal assembly elections, 2016: Narayangarh
| Party | Candidate | Votes | % | ±% |
|---|---|---|---|---|
| AITC | Prodyut Kumar Ghosh | 99,311 | 49.39 | +2.89 |
| CPI(M) | Dr. Surjya Kanta Mishra | 85,715 | 42.63 | −7.87 |
| BJP | Krishna Prasad Roy | 10,262 | 5.10 | +2.10 |
| SUCI(C) | Surya Pradhan | 3,984 | 1.98 | |
| NOTA | None of the above | 1,786 | 0.89 | |
| Turnout | | 201,065 | 90.85 | −1.92 |
| AITC gain from CPI(M) | | Swing | | |

=== 2011 ===
In the 2011 elections, Dr. Surjya Kanta Mishra of CPI(M) defeated his nearest rival Surjya Kanta Atta of Trinamool Congress.

West Bengal assembly elections, 2011: Narayangarh
| Party | Candidate | Votes | % | ±% |
|---|---|---|---|---|
| CPI(M) | Dr Surjya Kanta Mishra | 89,804 | 50.50 | −6.18 |
| AITC | Surja Kanta Atta | 82,695 | 46.50 | +8.69# |
| BJP | Krishna Prasad Roy | 5,345 | 3.00 | |
| Turnout | | 177,844 | 92.77 | |
| CPI(M) hold | | Swing | -14.87# | |

.# Swing calculated on Congress+Trinamool Congress vote percentages taken together in 2006.

=== 2006 ===
In 2006, 2001, 1996 and 1991 state assembly elections, Surjya Kanta Mishra of CPI(M) won the Narayangarh assembly seat defeating Salil Kumar Das Pattanayak of Trinamool Congress in 2006 and 2001, Durgesh Mishra of Congress in 1996 and Salil Kumar Das Pattanayak of Congress in 1991. Contests in most years were multi cornered but only winners and runners are being mentioned. Bibhuti Bhusan De of CPI(M) defeated Timir Baran Pahari of Congress in 1987 and Krishna Das Roy of Congress in 1982. Krishna Das Roy of Congress defeated Mihir Kumar Laha of Janata Party in 1977.

=== 2001 ===
In the 2001 elections, Dr. Surjya Kanta Mishra of CPI(M) defeated his nearest rival Salil Kumar Das Pattanayak of Trinamool Congress.

2001 West Bengal Legislative Assembly election: Narayangarh
| Party | Candidate | Votes | % | ±% |
|---|---|---|---|---|
| CPI(M) | Dr. Surjya Kanta Mishra | 75,612 | 54.19 | |
| AITC | Salil Kr. Das Pattanayak | 48,699 | 34.90 | |
| BJP | Krishna Prasad Roy | 9,805 | 7.03 | |
| Independent | Surjya Kanta Pradhan | 3,828 | 2.74 | |
| Independent | Ashoke Mondal | 1,592 | 1.14 | |
| Turnout | | 139,536 | 84.54 | |
| CPI(M) hold | | Swing | -14.87# | |

.# Swing calculated on Congress+Trinamool Congress vote percentages taken together in 2001.

=== 1996 ===
In the 1996 elections, Dr. Surjya Kanta Mishra of CPI(M) defeated his nearest rival Salil Kumar Das Pattanayak of Congress.

West Bengal assembly elections, 1996: Narayangarh
| Party | Candidate | Votes | % | ±% |
|---|---|---|---|---|
| CPI(M) | Dr. Surjya Kanta Mishra | 79,565 | 60.78 | |
| INC | Salil Kr. Das Pattanayak | 39,911 | 30.49 | |
| BJP | Dilip Kumar Patra | 6,526 | 4.99 | |
| Independent | Panchanan Pradhan | 4,894 | 3.74 | |
| Turnout | | 1,30,896 | 89.20 | |
| CPI(M) hold | | Swing | -14.87# | |

=== 1991 ===
In the 1991 elections, Dr. Surjya Kanta Mishra of CPI(M) defeated his nearest rival Salil Kumar Das Pattanayak of Congress.

West Bengal assembly elections, 1991: Narayangarh
| Party | Candidate | Votes | % | ±% |
|---|---|---|---|---|
| CPI(M) | Dr. Surjya Kanta Mishra | 61,898 | 55.80 | |
| INC | Salil Das Pattanayak | 39,631 | 35.73 | |
| BJP | Bijoy Krishna Tewari | 4,047 | 3.65 | |
| Independent | Panchanan Pradhan | 3,555 | 3.20 | |
| JP | Asok Kumar Das | 815 | 0.73 | |
| Independent | Niranjan Patra | 753 | 0.68 | |
| Independent | Saktipada Guchhait | 232 | 0,21 | |
| Turnout | | 1,30,896 | 89.20 | |
| CPI(M) hold | | Swing | | |

=== 1972 ===
Braja Kishore Maity of Congress won in 1972 and 1971. Mihir Kumar Laha of Bangla Congress won in 1969. K.D.Roy of Congress won in 1967. Krishna Prasad Mondal of Congress won in 1962. The Narayanagarh seat was not there in 1957. In independent India's first election in 1951, Surendranath Pramanik of KMPP and Krishna Chandra Satpati of BJS won the Narayangarh dual seat.
