= Hansda =

Hansda, also spelled as Hansdah or Hasda or Hansdak; is a surname found in India. Notable people with the surname include:

- Chunibala Hansda, Indian politician
- Jhano Hansdah, Indian archer
- Matilal Hansda, Indian politician
- Naren Hansda, Indian politician
- Rama Chandra Hansdah, Indian politician
- Rupchand Hansda, Indian writer
- Subodh Chandra Hansda (born 1927), Indian politician
- Sukumar Hansda (1954–2020), Indian politician
- Thomas Hansda, Indian politician
- Vijay Hansda, Indian politician
