= Narayan Choubey =

Indian politician

Member of Parliament, Lok Sabha
- In office 1980-1989
- Preceded by: Sudhir Kumar Ghosal
- Succeeded by: Indrajit Gupta
- Constituency: Midnapore

Member of the West Bengal Legislative Assembly
- In office 1957–1969
- Preceded by: Muhammad Mumtaz Moulana
- Succeeded by: Gyan Singh Sohanpal
- Constituency: Kharagpur Town

Personal details
- Born: 12 January 1923 Pathakpara, Bankura District, Bengal Presidency, British India
- Party: Communist Party of India
- Spouse: Gouri Choubey
- Children: Two Sons

Narayan Choubey (born 12 January 1923, Died around 1997-98) was an Indian politician. He was elected to the Lok Sabha, lower house of the Parliament of India from Midnapore, West Bengal as a member of the Communist Party of India. In 2008, it was noted that Choubey was deceased. Koustav Bagchi of BJP, now a Member of Legislative Assembly (MLA) from Barrackpore Constituency is related to him maternally, Narayan Choubey was Koustav's mother's uncle.
