= Muhammad Momtaz =

West Bengal politician

Maulana Muhammad Momtaz

Member of West Bengal Legislative Assembly
- In office 1951–1957
- Preceded by: Constituency established
- Succeeded by: Narayan Chobey
- Constituency: Kharagpur Assembly constituency

Personal details
- Born: Kharagpur, Midnapore district, Bengal Presidency
- Party: Indian National Congress

Maulana Muhammad Momtaz was an Islamic scholar and politician belonging to the Indian National Congress. He was a member of the first West Bengal Legislative Assembly.

== Early life ==
Momtaz was born into a Bengali Muslim family in Kharagpur, Midnapore district, Bengal Presidency.

== Career ==
Momtaz contested in the 1952 West Bengal Legislative Assembly election where he ran as an Indian National Congress candidate for Kharagpur Assembly constituency, defeating Hindutva-oriented Bharatiya Jana Sangh politician B. C. Ghose. He lost to Marxist candidate Narayan Chobey in the 1957 West Bengal Legislative Assembly election.
