= Paresh Murmu =

Indian politician

Member of the West Bengal Legislative Assembly
- In office 19 May 2016 – 5 May 2026
- Preceded by: Biram Mandi
- Constituency: Keshiary

Personal details
- Party: AITC
- Profession: Politician

Paresh Murmu is an Indian politician member of All India Trinamool Congress. He is an MLA, elected from the Keshiary constituency in the 2016 West Bengal state assembly election. In 2021 assembly election he was re-elected from the same constituency.
