= Surja Kanta Atta =

India politician

Surja Kanta Atta (born 1964) is an Indian politician from West Bengal. He is a former member of the West Bengal Legislative Assembly from Narayangarh Assembly constituency in Paschim Medinipur district. He won the 2021 West Bengal Legislative Assembly election representing the All India Trinamool Congress.

== Early life and education ==
Atta is from Narayangarh, Paschim Medinipur district, West Bengal. He is the son of Ananta Atta. He passed Class 12 in 1997. His wife is a teacher.

== Career ==
Atta won from Narayangarh Assembly constituency representing All India Trinamool Congress in the 2021 West Bengal Legislative Assembly election. He polled 100,894 votes and defeated his nearest rival, Ramprasad Giri of the Bharatiya Janata Party, by a margin of 2,416 votes.
