= Dinen Roy =

Indian politician

Member of the West Bengal Legislative Assembly
- Incumbent
- Assumed office 19 May 2016
- Preceded by: Nazmul Haque
- Constituency: Kharagpur

Personal details
- Born: October 19, 1955 (age 71)
- Party: AITC (until 2026); Democratic Trinamool Congress (from 2026)
- Profession: Politician

Dinen Roy (19 October,1955) is an Indian politician member of Democratic Trinamool Congress. He is an MLA, elected from the Kharagpur constituency in the 2016 West Bengal state assembly election. In 2021 assembly election he was re-elected from the same constituency.
