= Subodh Chandra Hansda =

Indian politician (1927–2004)

Subodh Chandra Hansda (1927 – 26 September 2004) was member of 5th Lok Sabha from Medinipur (Lok Sabha constituency) in West Bengal State, India.

Hansda was born in the village of Jubrajpur, Midnapore district in 1927. He was elected to 1st and 2nd Lok Sabha from Midinipur and to 3rd Lok Sabha from Jhargram (Lok Sabha constituency).

Hansda died in Midnapore, West Bengal on 26 September 2004, at the age of 77.
