= Nayagram (community development block) =

- Community development block
- Coordinates: 22.0319°N 87.1781°E
- Country: India
- State: West Bengal
- District: Jhargram

Government
  - Type: Federal democracy

Area
  - Total: 501.44 km^{2} (193.61 sq mi)
- Elevation: 24 m (79 ft)

Population (2011)
  - Total: 142,199
  - Density: 283.58/km^{2} (734.47/sq mi)

Languages
  - Official: Bengali, English
  - Other: Santali, Hindi, Kudmali/Kurmali
- Time zone: UTC+5:30 (IST)
- PIN: 721138 (Nayagram); 721125 (Baligeria)
- Area code: 03229
- ISO 3166 code: IN-WB
- Vehicle registration: WB-34
- Literacy: 63.70%
- Lok Sabha constituency: Jhargram
- Vidhan Sabha constituency: Nayagram
- Website: jhargram.gov.in

Nayagram is a community development block that forms an administrative division in Jhargram subdivision of Jhargram district in the Indian state of West Bengal.

== History ==
The Nayagram block, historically part of Nayagram estate, encompassed parganas Khelar Nayagram, Dippa Kiarchand, and Jamirapal, spanning both banks of the Subarnarekha river, with its headquarters situated at Kultikri. The raja of Nayagram originally held the position of a Maratha paika sardar. Upon the estate's annexation to the Midnapore district by the British in 1803, the Raja fled due to his allegiance to the Marathas, while his son sided with the British. Within Khelar Nayagram, two forts stand out: Khelar Garh, whose construction commenced under Pratap Chandra Singh in 1490 BC and was finalized by Balabhadra Singh, the third raja of Khelar. Additionally, another fort is said to have been erected by Raja Chandra Ketu in the 16th century. The Nawab of Murshidabad held de facto ownership over the parganas of Nayagram and Khelargram. Dipa Kiarchand was mostly owned by raja of Mayurbhanj, including the Rohini of Sankrail and Gopibalavpur area. In Dipa Kiarchand there are number of prehistoric memorial pillar indicating aboriginal inhabitants in the northern side of Subarnarekha, and the southern side of the river, which constitute the present-day Nayagram block was a forest land with smaller zaminadris like Jamirapal and Olmara. However, historically, the estate collectively had been under the dominion of both Odisha and Bengal.

=== Red corridor ===
106 districts spanning 10 states across India, described as being a part of the left wing extremism activities, constitutes the Red corridor. In West Bengal the districts of Pashim Medinipur, Bankura, Purulia and Birbhum are part of the Red corridor. However, as of July 2016, there has been no reported incidents of Maoist related activities from these districts for the previous 4 years. In the period 2009-2011 LWE violence resulted in more than 500 deaths and a similar number missing in Paschim Medinipur district.

The Lalgarh movement, which started attracting attention after the failed assassination attempt on Buddhadeb Bhattacharjee, then chief minister of West Bengal, in the Salboni area of Paschim Medinipur district, on 2 November 2008 and the police action that followed, had also spread over to these areas. The movement was not just a political struggle but an armed struggle that concurrently took the look of a social struggle. A large number of CPI (M) activists, and others active in different political parties, were killed. Although the epi-centre of the movement was Lalgarh, it was spread across 19 police stations in three adjoining districts – Paschim Medinipur, Bankura and Purulia, all thickly forested and near the border with Jharkhand. The deployment of CRPF and other forces started on 11 June 2009. The movement came to an end after the 2011 state assembly elections and change of government in West Bengal. The death of Kishenji, the Maoist commander, on 24 November 2011 was the last major landmark.

From 2009 Maoist violence had rapidly spread across eleven western CD blocks of the district: Binpur I, Binpur II, Salboni, Garhbeta II, Jamboni, Jhargram, Midnapore Sadar, Gopiballavpur I, Gopiballavpur II, Sankrail and Nayagram.

== Geography ==
The Chota Nagpur Plateau gradually slopes down creating an undulating area with infertile laterite rocks/ soil. In Nayagram CD block 90% of the cultivated area has lateritic soil and 10% has alluvial soil. Nayagram CD block is drought prone with a particularly severe drought situation.

Nayagram is located at 22°01′55″N 87°10′41″E.

Nayagram CD block is bounded by Gopiballavpur II, Sankrail and Keshiari CD blocks in the north, Dantan I CD block and Jaleswar CD block/tehsil in Balasore district in Odisha, in the east, Moroda and Rasabobindapur CD blocks/tehsils, in Mayurbhanj district in Odisha, in the south and Suliapada CD block/tehsil, in Mayurbhanj district, in the west.

It is located 53 km from Midnapore, the district headquarters.

Nayagram CD block has an area of 501.44 km^{2}. It has 1 panchayat samity, 12 gram panchayats, 104 gram sansads (village councils), 336 mouzas and 294 inhabited villages. Nayagram police station serves this block. Headquarters of this CD block is at Baligeria.

Nayagram CD block had a forest cover of 15,400 hectares, against a total geographical area of 50,560 hectares in 2005-06.

Gram panchayats of Nayagram block panchayat samiti are: Arrah, Baligeria, Barakhakri, Baranigui, Berajal, Chandabila, Chandrarekha, Jamirapal, Kharikamathani, Malam, Nayagram and Patina.

== Demographics ==
=== Population ===
According to the 2011 Census of India, Nayagram CD block had a total population of 142,199, all of which were rural. There were 71,537 (50%) males and 70,662 (50%) females. Population in the age range 0–6 years was 17,598. Scheduled Castes numbered 28,899 (20.32%) and Scheduled Tribes numbered 56,887 (40.01%).

According to the 2001 census, Nayagram block had a total population of 123,929, out of which 62,588 were males and 61,341 were females. Nayagram block registered a population growth of 16.38 per cent during the 1991-2001 decade. Decadal growth for the combined Midnapore district was 14.87 per cent. Decadal growth in West Bengal was 17.45 per cent.

Villages in Nayagram CD block included (2011 census figures in brackets): Nayagram (2,300), Patina (884), Chandabila (967), Chandrarekha (542), Arra (684), Baligeria (444), Kharikamathani (2002), Malam (991), Jamirapat (769) and Berajal (288).

=== Literacy ===
According to the 2011 census the total number of literate persons in Nayagram CD block was 79,369 (63.70% of the population over 6 years) out of which males numbered 46,340 (74.06% of the male population over 6 years) and females numbered 33,029 (53.25% of the female population over 6 years). The gender gap in literacy rates was 20.81%.

See also – List of West Bengal districts ranked by literacy rate

Literacy in CD blocks of
Paschim Medinipur district
Jhargram subdivision
Binpur I – 69.74%
Binpur II – 70.46%
Gopiballavpur I – 65.44%
Gopiballavpur II – 71.40%
Jamboni – 72.63%
Jhargram – 72.23%
Nayagram – 63.70%
Sankrail – 73.35%
Medinipur Sadar subdivision
Garhbeta I – 72.21%
Garhbeta II – 75.87%
Garhbeta III – 73.42%
Keshpur – 77.88%
Midnapore Sadar – 70.48%
Salboni – 74.87%
Ghatal subdivision
Chandrakona I – 78.93%
Chandrakona II – 75.96%
Daspur I – 83.99%
Daspur II – 85.62%
Ghatal – 81.08%
Kharagpur subdivision
Dantan I – 73.53%
Dantan II – 82.45%
Debra – 82.03%
Keshiari – 76.78%
Kharagpur I – 77.06%
Kharagpur II – 76.08%
Mohanpur – 80.51%
Narayangarh – 78.31%
Pingla – 83.57%
Sabang – 86.84%
2011 Census: CD Block Wise

Primary Census Abstract Data

=== Language and religion ===
Religion in Nayagram CD block (2011)
Hinduism	85.45%
Other (tribal religion)	11.26%
Christianity	1.77%
Other or not stated	0.32%

In the 2011 census Hindus numbered 121,502 and formed 85.45% of the population in Nayagram CD block. Christians numbered 2,514 and formed 1.77% of the population. Others numbered 16,470 and formed 11.58% of the population. Others include Addi Bassi, Marang Boro, Santal, Saranath, Sari Dharma, Sarna, Alchchi, Bidin, Sant, Saevdharm, Seran, Saran, Sarin, Kheria, and other religious communities. In 2001, Hindus were 80.59%, Muslims 1.07%, Christians 1.73% and tribal religions 16.53% of the population respectively.

Languages of Nayagram CD block (2011)
1. Bengali (59.9%)
2. Santali (29.8%)
3. Kurmali (3.81%)
4. Mundari (3.20%)
5. Odia (1.26%)
6. Others (2.06%)

At the time of the 2011 census, 59.88% of the population spoke Bengali, 29.79% Santali, 3.81% Kurmali, 3.20% Mundari and 1.26% Odia as their first language.

== BPL families ==
In Nayagram CD block 69.26% families were living below poverty line in 2007.

According to the District Human Development Report of Paschim Medinipur: The 29 CD blocks of the district were classified into four categories based on the poverty ratio. Nayagram, Binpur II and Jamboni CD blocks have very high poverty levels (above 60%). Kharagpur I, Kharagpur II, Sankrail, Garhbeta II, Pingla and Mohanpur CD blocks have high levels of poverty (50-60%), Jhargram, Midnapore Sadar, Dantan I, Gopiballavpur II, Binpur I, Dantan II, Keshiari, Chandrakona I, Gopiballavpur I, Chandrakona II, Narayangarh, Keshpur, Ghatal, Sabang, Garhbeta I, Salboni, Debra and Garhbeta III CD blocks have moderate levels of poverty (25-50%) and Daspur II and Daspur I CD blocks have low levels of poverty (below 25%).

== Economy ==
=== Infrastructure ===
280 or 83% of mouzas in Nayagram CD block were electrified by 31 March 2014.

322 mouzas in Nayagram CD block had drinking water facilities in 2013-14. There were 54 fertiliser depots, 6 seed stores and 38 fair price shops in the CD block.

=== Agriculture ===
Persons engaged in agriculture
in Nayagram CD block
1. Bargadars (2.52%)
2. Patta holders (30.8%)
3. Small farmers (2.73%)
4. Marginal farmers (22.7%)
5. Agricultural labourers (41.3%)

Although the Bargadari Act of 1950 recognised the rights of bargadars to a higher share of crops from the land that they tilled, it was not implemented fully. Large tracts, beyond the prescribed limit of land ceiling, remained with the rich landlords. From 1977 onwards major land reforms took place in West Bengal. Land in excess of land ceiling was acquired and distributed amongst the peasants. Following land reforms land ownership pattern has undergone transformation. In 2013-14, persons engaged in agriculture in Nayagram CD block could be classified as follows: bargadars 2.52%, patta (document) holders 30.78%, small farmers (possessing land between 1 and 2 hectares) 2.73%, marginal farmers (possessing land up to 1 hectare) 22.66% and agricultural labourers 41.31%.

In 2005-06 net cropped area in Nayagram CD block was 22,826 hectares and the area in which more than one crop was grown was 15,126 hectares.

The extension of irrigation has played a role in growth of the predominantly agricultural economy. In 2013-14, the total area irrigated in Nayagram CD block was 5,300 hectares, out of which 1,500 hectares were by tank water, 300 hectares by deep tubewells, 600 hectares by shallow tube wells, 500 hectares by river lift irrigation, 900 hectares by open dug wells and 1,500 hectares by other methods.

In 2013-14, Nayagram CD block produced 3,745 tonnes of Aman paddy, the main winter crop, from 3,065 hectares, 784 tonnes of Aus paddy (summer crop) from 367 hectares, 1,234 tonnes of Boro paddy (spring crop) from 421 hectares and 42,599 tonnes of potatoes from 1,403 hectares. It also produced mustard.

=== Banking ===
In 2013-14, Nayagram CD block had offices of 10 commercial banks.

== Transport ==
Nayagram CD block has 5 ferry services and 11 originating/ terminating bus routes. The nearest railway station is 25 km from the CD block headquarters.

State Highway 9 originating from Durgapur (in Paschim Bardhaman district) terminates at Nayagram.

== Education ==
In 2013-14, Nayagram CD block had 164 primary schools with 9,046 students, 24 middle schools with 1,355 students and 20 higher secondary schools with 14,309 students. Nayagram CD block had 525 institutions for special and non-formal education with 12,180 students.

The United Nations Development Programme considers the combined primary and secondary enrolment ratio as the simple indicator of educational achievement of the children in the school going age. The infrastructure available is important. In Sankrail CD block out of the total 151 primary schools in 2008-2009, 113 had pucca buildings, 12 partially pucca and 26 multiple type.

Nayagram and Gopiballavpur I CD blocks have been identified as educationally backward blocks and special efforts are being made through National Programme of Education for Girls at Elementary Level and Kasturba Gandhi Balika Vidyalaya hostels. These are the hostels for accommodating girl students from weaker sections of the society and all costs relating to their livelihood are borne by the government so that they are not to be deprived of availing elementary education for want of money or other social issues.

Nayagram Pandit Raghunath Murmu Government College was established in 2014 at Baligeria. It is affiliated to Vidyasagar University. It offers courses in Bengali, Santali, English, Sanskrit, history, philosophy, political science and sociology. The college is named after the great scholar Pandit Raghunath Murmu (1905–1982) who developed the Ol Chiki alphabet of Santali language.

== Healthcare ==
Kharikamathani Rural Hospital, with 30 beds at Kharikamathani, is the major government medical facility in Nayagram CD block. There are primary health centres at: Chandabila (with 10 beds), Jamirapal (with 6 beds) and Baligeria (with 6 beds).

The 300-bedded Superspeciality Hospital at Nayagram was inaugurated in 2015.
