= Dulal Murmu =

Indian politician

Member of the West Bengal Legislative Assembly
- In office 13 May 2011 – 4 May 2026
- Preceded by: Bhutnath Saren
- Succeeded by: Amiya Kisku
- Constituency: Nayagram

Personal details
- Born: 7 March 1980 (age 46) Nayagram, West Bengal, India
- Party: All India Trinamool Congress
- Education: Vidyasagar University

Dulal Murmu is an MLA of Nayagram Vidhan Sabha constituency from All India Trinamool Congress.
