= Beliaberah =

Beliaberah Beliabera
- Village
- Location in West Bengal, India Beliaberah (India)
- Coordinates: 22°16′18.5″N 86°57′08.6″E
- Country: India
- State: West Bengal
- District: Jhargram

Population (2011)
  - Total: 1,685

Languages
  - Official: Bengali, Santali, English
- Time zone: UTC+5:30 (IST)
- Telephone/STD code: 03221
- Lok Sabha constituency: Jhargram
- Vidhan Sabha constituency: Gopiballavpur
- Website: jhargram.gov.in

Beliaberah (also referred to as Beliabera, Belaberya) is a village in the Gopiballavpur II CD block in the Jhargram subdivision of the Jhargram district in the state of West Bengal, India.

== Geography ==
Cities and towns in Jhargram subdivision of Jhargram district
CT: census town, R: rural/ urban centre, H: historical/ religious centre
Owing to space constraints in the small map, the actual locations in a larger map may vary slightly

=== Location ===
Beliaberah is located at 22°16′18.5″N 86°57′08.6″E.

=== Area overview ===
Jhargram subdivision, the only one in Jhargram district, shown in the map alongside, is composed of hills, mounds and rolling lands. It is rather succinctly described in the District Human Development Report, 2011 (at that time it was part of Paschim Medinipur district), “The western boundary is more broken and picturesque, for the lower ranges of the Chhotanagpur Hills line the horizon, the jungle assumes the character of forest, and large trees begin to predominate. The soil, however, is lateritic, a considerable area is unproductive, almost uninhabited, especially in the extreme north-west where there are several hills over 1000 feet in height. The remainder of the country is an almost level plain broken only by the sand hills.” 3.48% of the population lives in urban areas and 96.52% lives in the rural areas. 20.11% of the total population belonged to scheduled castes and 29.37% belonged to scheduled tribes.

Note: The map alongside presents some of the notable locations in the subdivision. All places marked in the map are linked in the larger full screen map.

== Demographics ==
According to the 2011 Census of India, Belaberya had a total population of 1,685 of which 828 (49%) were males and 857 (51%) were females. Population in the age range 0–6 years was 207. The total number of literate persons in Belaberya was 897 (53.23% of the population over 6 years).

== Civic administration ==
=== CD block HQ ===
The headquarters of Gopiballavpur II CD block are located at Beliaberah.

=== Police station ===
Beliaberah police station has jurisdiction over Gopiballavpur II CD block.

== Education ==
Government General Degree College was established in 2015. It is affiliated to Vidyasagar University. It offers general courses in science and arts and honours courses in Bengali, English, sociology, anthropology and geology.
