= Leba Chand Tudu =

Indian politician

- লেবা চাঁদ টুডু

Gopiballavpur Area Secretary of CPI(ML)
- In office 1969–1971

General Secretary of SOC, CPI(ML)
- In office 16 August 1979 – 8 November 2021

West Bengal State committee member of CPI(ML) Liberation
- In office 8 November 2021 – 2 July 2022

Personal details
- Born: 13 January 1949 Jhargram, West Bengal
- Died: 2 July 2022 Midnapore, West Bengal
- Party: Communist Party of India (Marxist-Leninist) Liberation (from 2021)
- Other political affiliations: CPI(ML) (1969–1971); PCC, CPI(ML)(1971–1978); SOC, CPI(ML) (1979–2021)
- Profession: Politician, social activist

Leba Chand Tudu (Bengali: লেবা চাঁদ টুডু); was an Indian Communist politician. In August 1969, he was included in the Bengal-Bihar-Orissa Border Regional Committee of the Communist Party of India (Marxist-Leninist). As of 1970 he was the Gopibhallavpur Area Committee secretary of CPI(ML). He emerged as a leader of tribal communities in Jhargram district, and struggled for promotion of Santhali language. Tudu was released from jail in 1977. He contested the Nayagram Assembly constituency seat in the 1977 West Bengal Legislative Assembly election. He finished in third place with 7,071 votes (17.49%). He stood as a candidate in the Jhargram constituency in the 1980 Indian general election, finishing in third place with 29,338 votes (5.97%).

After the division of Communist Party of India (Marxist-Leninist), he led the State Organising Committee, Communist Party of India (Marxist–Leninist) as its general secretary between 1979 and 2021. On 8 November 2021, SOC, CPI(ML) merged on the CPI(ML) Liberation. After the party merged, he became a member of the West Bengal State Committee member of CPI(ML) Liberation.
