= Bhutnath Saren =

Indian politician

Member of Legislative Assembly
- In office 2001–2011
- Preceded by: Bhutnath Saren
- Constituency: Nayagram

Personal details
- Born: Nayagram, West Bengal, India
- Party: Communist Party of India (Marxist)
- Education: Vidyasagar University

Bhutnath Saren is an Indian former MLA of Nayagram Vidhan Sabha constituency from Communist Party of India (Marxist).
