= Sankrail, Jhargram (community development block) =

Sankrail
- Community development block
- Coordinates: 22.276°N 87.118°E
- Country: India
- State: West Bengal
- District: Jhargram

Government
  - Type: Federal democracy

Area
  - Total: 276.80 km^{2} (106.87 sq mi)

Population (2001)
  - Total: 102,626
  - Density: 370.76/km^{2} (960.26/sq mi)

Languages
  - Official: Bengali, Santali, Kudmali/Kurmali, English
- Time zone: UTC+5:30 (IST)
- ISO 3166 code: IN-WB
- Lok Sabha constituency: Jhargram
- Vidhan Sabha constituency: Gopiballavpur
- Website: jhargram.gov.in

Sankrail is a community development block that forms an administrative division in Jhargram subdivision of Jhargram district in the Indian state of West Bengal.

== History ==
=== Red corridor ===
The Red corridor, which consists of 106 districts across 10 states in India are described a part of the Left wing extremism activities. This includes the districts of Pashim Medinipur, Bankura, Purulia and Birbhum in West Bengal. However, as of July 2016, there has been no reported incidents of Maoist related activities from these districts for the previous 4 years. In the period 2009-2011 LWE violence resulted in more than 500 deaths and a similar number missing in Paschim Medinipur district.

The Lalgarh movement, which started attracting attention after the failed assassination attempt on Buddhadeb Bhattacharjee, then chief minister of West Bengal, in the Salboni area of Paschim Medinipur district, on 2 November 2008 and the police action that followed, had also spread over to these areas. The movement was not just a political struggle but an armed struggle that concurrently took the look of a social struggle. A large number of CPI (M) activists, and others active in different political parties, were killed. Although the epi-centre of the movement was Lalgarh, it was spread across 19 police stations in three adjoining districts – Paschim Medinipur, Bankura and Purulia, all thickly forested and near the border with Jharkhand. The deployment of CRPF and other forces started on 11 June 2009. The movement came to an end after the 2011 state assembly elections and change of government in West Bengal. The death of Kishenji, the Maoist commander, on 24 November 2011 was the last major landmark.

From 2009 Maoist violence had rapidly spread across eleven western CD blocks of the district: Binpur I, Binpur II, Salboni, Garhbeta II, Jamboni, Jhargram, Midnapore Sadar, Gopiballavpur I, Gopiballavpur II, Sankrail and Nayagram.

== Geography ==
The Chota Nagpur Plateau gradually slopes down creating an undulating area with infertile laterite rocks/ soil. In Sankrail CD block 80% of the cultivated area has lateritic soil and 20% has alluvial soil. Sankrail CD block is drought prone with a particularly severe drought situation.

Sankrail is located at 22°16′34″N 87°07′05″E.

Sankrail CD block is bounded by Jhargram and Kharagpur I CD blocks in the north, Keshiari CD block in the east, Nayagram CD block in the south and Gopiballavpur II CD block in the west.

It is located 31 km from Midnapore, the district headquarters.

Sankrail CD block has an area of 276.80 km^{2}. It has 1 panchayat samity, 10 gram panchayats, 87 gram sansads (village councils), 287 mouzas and 257 inhabited villages. Sankrail police station serves this block. Headquarters of this CD block is at Rohini.

Sankrail CD block had a forest cover of 1,620 hectares, against a total geographical area of 27,610 hectares in 2005–06.

Gram panchayats of Sankrail block/ panchayat samiti are:Andhari, Chhatri, Dhanghori, Khudmarai, Kultikri, Laudaha, Pathra, Ragra, Rohini and Sankrail.

== Demographics ==
=== Population ===
According to the 2011 Census of India Sankrail CD block had a total population of 115,418, all of which were rural. There were 58,240 (50%) males and 57,178 (50%) females. Population in the age range 0–6 years was 13,128, Scheduled Castes numbered 21,004 (18.20%) and Scheduled Tribes numbered 28,825 (24.97%).

According to the 2001 census, Sankrail block had a total population of 102,626, out of which 52,096 were males and 50,530 were females. Sankrail block registered a population growth of 17.04 per cent during the 1991-2001 decade. Decadal growth for the combined Midnapore district was 14.87 per cent. Decadal growth in West Bengal was 17.45 per cent.

Large villages (with 4,000+ population) in Sankrail CD block are (2011 census figures in brackets): Ragra (5,916),

Other villages in Sankrail CD block included (2011 census figures in brackets): Andhari (797), Pathra (660), Sankrail (491), Rohini (1,691), Laudaha (2,300), Kultikri (797), Chhatri (704), Dhanghari (864) and Khudmarai (639).

=== Literacy ===
According to the 2011 census the total number of literates in Sankrail CD block was 75,028 (73.35% of the population over 6 years) out of which males numbered 41,793 (81.01% of the male population over 6 years) and females numbered 33,235 (65.55% of the female population over 6 years). The gender gap in literacy rates was 15.47%.

See also – List of West Bengal districts ranked by literacy rate

Literacy in CD blocks of
Paschim Medinipur district
Jhargram subdivision
Binpur I – 69.74%
Binpur II – 70.46%
Gopiballavpur I – 65.44%
Gopiballavpur II – 71.40%
Jamboni – 72.63%
Jhargram – 72.23%
Nayagram – 63.70%
Sankrail – 73.35%
Medinipur Sadar subdivision
Garhbeta I – 72.21%
Garhbeta II – 75.87%
Garhbeta III – 73.42%
Keshpur – 77.88%
Midnapore Sadar – 70.48%
Salboni – 74.87%
Ghatal subdivision
Chandrakona I – 78.93%
Chandrakona II – 75.96%
Daspur I – 83.99%
Daspur II – 85.62%
Ghatal – 81.08%
Kharagpur subdivision
Dantan I – 73.53%
Dantan II – 82.45%
Debra – 82.03%
Keshiari – 76.78%
Kharagpur I – 77.06%
Kharagpur II – 76.08%
Mohanpur – 80.51%
Narayangarh – 78.31%
Pingla – 83.57%
Sabang – 86.84%
2011 Census: CD Block Wise

Primary Census Abstract Data

=== Language and religion ===
Religion in Sankrail CD block (2011)
Hinduism	96.35%
Islam	1.81%
Other (tribal religion)	1.01%
Christianity	0.72%
Other or not stated	0.11%

In the 2011 census Hindus numbered 111,205 and formed 96.35% of the population in Sankrail CD block. Muslims numbered 2,094 and formed 1.81% of the population. Christians numbered 827 and formed 0.72% of the population. Others numbered 1,292 and formed 1.11% of the population. Others include Addi Bassi, Marang Boro, Santal, Saranath, Sari Dharma, Sarna, Alchchi, Bidin, Sant, Saevdharm, Seran, Saran, Sarin, Kheria, and other religious communities. In 2001, Hindus were 88.70%, Muslims 1.56%, Christians 0.88% and tribal religions 8.76% of the population respectively.

Languages of Sankrail CD block (2011)
1. Bengali (82.5%)
2. Santali (10.9%)
3. Mundari (4.68%)
4. Kurmali (1.23%)
5. Others (0.72%)

At the time of the 2011 census, 82.46% of the population spoke Bengali, 10.91% Santali, 4.68% Mundari and 1.23% Kurmali as their first language.

== BPL families ==
In Sankrail CD block 51.33% families were living below poverty line in 2007.

According to the District Human Development Report of Paschim Medinipur: The 29 CD blocks of the district were classified into four categories based on the poverty ratio. Nayagram, Binpur II and Jamboni CD blocks have very high poverty levels (above 60%). Kharagpur I, Kharagpur II, Sankrail, Garhbeta II, Pingla and Mohanpur CD blocks have high levels of poverty (50-60%), Jhargram, Midnapore Sadar, Dantan I, Gopiballavpur II, Binpur I, Dantan II, Keshiari, Chandrakona I, Gopiballavpur I, Chandrakona II, Narayangarh, Keshpur, Ghatal, Sabang, Garhbeta I, Salboni, Debra and Garhbeta III CD blocks have moderate levels of poverty (25-50%) and Daspur II and Daspur I CD blocks have low levels of poverty (below 25%).

== Economy ==
=== Infrastructure ===
245 or 85% of mouzas in Sankrail CD block were electrified by 31 March 2014.

246 mouzas in Sankrail CD block had drinking water facilities in 2013–14. There were 43 fertiliser depots, 20 seed stores and 33 fair price shops in the CD block.

=== Agriculture ===
Persons engaged in agriculture
in Sankrail CD block
1. Bargadars (4.87%)
2. Patta holders (41.2%)
3. Small farmers (2.15%)
4. Marginal farmers (16.6%)
5. Agricultural labourers (35.1%)

Although the Bargadari Act of 1950 recognised the rights of bargadars to a higher share of crops from the land that they tilled, it was not implemented fully. Large tracts, beyond the prescribed limit of land ceiling, remained with the rich landlords. From 1977 onwards major land reforms took place in West Bengal. Land in excess of land ceiling was acquired and distributed amongst the peasants. Following land reforms land ownership pattern has undergone transformation. In 2013–14, persons engaged in agriculture in Sankrail CD block could be classified as follows: bargadars 4.87%, patta (document) holders 41.19%, small farmers (possessing land between 1 and 2 hectares) 2.15%, marginal farmers (possessing land up to 1 hectare) 16.65% and agricultural labourers 35.14%.

In 2005-06 net cropped area in Sankrail CD block was 21,153 hectares and the area in which more than one crop was grown was 11,275 hectares.

The extension of irrigation has played a role in growth of the predominantly agricultural economy. In 2013–14, the total area irrigated in Sankrail CD block was 9,770 hectares, out of which 2,000 hectares were by canal waters, 160 hectares by tank water, 395 hectares by deep tubewells, 6,550 hectares by shallow tube wells, 450 hectares by river lift irrigation, 90 hectares by open dug wells and 125 hectares by other methods.

In 2013–14, Sankrail CD block produced 26,310 tonnes of Aman paddy, the main winter crop, from 15,874 hectares, 4,142 tonnes of Aus paddy (summer crop) from 1,489 hectares, 12,162 tonnes of Boro paddy (spring crop) from 4,152 hectares, 4,086 tonnes of potatoes from 145 hectares and 342,399 tonnes of sugar cane from 1,552 hectares. It also produced mustard and til.

=== Banking ===
In 2013–14, Sankrail CD block had offices of 8 commercial banks and 1 gramin bank.

== Transport ==
Sankrail CD block has 5 ferry services and 4 originating/ terminating bus routes. The nearest railway station is 45 km from the CD block headquarters.

== Education ==
In 2013–14, Sankrail CD block had 153 primary schools with 6,776 students, 26 middle schools with 1,552 students and 14 higher secondary schools with 10,365 students. Sankrail CD block had 1 general college with 704 students and 275 institutions for special and non-formal education with 8,496 students.

The United Nations Development Programme considers the combined primary and secondary enrolment ratio as the simple indicator of educational achievement of the children in the school going age. The infrastructure available is important. In Sankrail CD block out of the total 151 primary schools in 2008–2009, 113 had pucca buildings, 12 partially pucca and 26 multiple type.

Sankrail Anil Biswas Smriti Mahavidyalaya was established at Kultikri in 2007 and is affiliated to Vidyasagar University. It offers arts courses with honours in English, Bengali, Sanskrit, Santali, history and political science.

== Healthcare ==
In 2014, Sankrail CD block had 1 rural hospital and 2 primary health centres with total 51 beds and 3 doctors. It had 22 family welfare sub centres and 1 family welfare centre. 4,954 patients were treated indoor and 46,393 patients were treated outdoor in the hospitals, health centres and subcentres of the CD block.

Bhangagarh Rural Hospital, with 30 beds at Bhanga Gar, PO Keshiapata, is the major government medical facility in the Sankrail CD block. There are primary health centres at: Pathra (with 6 beds) and Kultikri (with 10 beds).
