= Rajesh Mahata =

Indian politician in West Bengal

Minister of State (Independent Charge), Government of West Bengal
- Incumbent
- Assumed office 1 June 2026
- Governor: R. N. Ravi
- Chief Minister: Suvendu Adhikari
- Departments: Animal Resources Development

Member of the West Bengal Legislative Assembly
- Incumbent
- Assumed office 4 May 2026
- Preceded by: Khagendra Nath Mahata
- Constituency: Gopiballavpur

Personal details
- Party: Bharatiya Janata Party
- Spouse: Mita Mahato
- Children: Shawoni Mahata; Aviraj Mahata
- Parent: Shatrughna Mahata
- Education: Vidyasagar University
- Occupation: Assistant Teacher
- Profession: Politician

Rajesh Mahata is an Indian politician from Jhargram district of West Bengal. He is a member of West Bengal Legislative Assembly, from Gopiballavpur Assembly constituency. He is a member of Bharatiya Janata Party. He is currently serving as the Minister of State (Independent Charge) for Animal Resources Development of West Bengal.

== Early life and education ==
Mahata is from Jhargram district of West Bengal. His qualification is Master of Arts in English and Bachelor of Education from Vidyasagar University in the year 1998 and 2000 respectively.

== Political career ==
He is a member of West Bengal Legislative Assembly, from Gopiballavpur Assembly constituency. He sworn in as a Ministers of State (Independent Charge) on 1 June 2026.

=== Electoral performance ===
West Bengal Legislative Assembly
Year	Constituency	Party	Votes	%	Opponent	Party	Votes	%	Margin	Result
2026	Gopiballavpur	BJP	1,14,683	53.75	Ajit Mahata	AITC	88,008	41.24	26,675	Won

== See also ==
- 2026 West Bengal Legislative Assembly election
- List of chief ministers of West Bengal
- West Bengal Legislative Assembly
