= Gopiballavpur II =

- Community development block
- Coordinates: 22.2249390°N 86.8664630°E
- Country: India
- State: West Bengal
- District: Jhargram

Government
  - Type: Federal democracy

Area
  - Total: 192.17 km^{2} (74.20 sq mi)
- Elevation: 82 m (269 ft)

Population (2011)
  - Total: 104,996
  - Density: 546.37/km^{2} (1,415.1/sq mi)

Languages
  - Official: Bengali, Santali, English
- Time zone: UTC+5:30 (IST)
- PIN: 721506 (Gopiballavpur); 721517 (Tapsia)
- Area code: 03221
- Vehicle registration: WB-34
- Literacy: 71.40%
- Lok Sabha constituency: Jhargram
- Vidhan Sabha constituency: Nayagram, Gopiballavpur
- Website: jhargram.gov.in

Gopiballavpur II is a community development block that forms an administrative division in Jhargram subdivision of Jhargram district in the Indian state of West Bengal.

== History ==
=== Naxalite movement in Debra-Gopiballavpur ===
In 1968 many revolutionary intellectuals, broadly termed as Naxalites, settled in Gopiballavpur. Amongst them was Santosh Rana, who was a local person. In September 1969 a guerrilla squad killed an oppressive landlord. The landlords fled to the towns and a big peasant movement began. Landlords’ crops were forcibly harvested. Around 150 people were killed. Santosh Rana was the key figure in virtually “liberating” Debra, Gopiballavpur and neighbouring areas in West Bengal, as well as in Odisha and Jharkhand (then it was Bihar). The movement gradually split and collapsed in the early seventies.

=== Red corridor ===
106 districts spanning 10 states across India, described as being a part of the Left Wing Extremism activities, constitutes the Red corridor. In West Bengal the districts of Pashim Medinipur, Bankura, Purulia and Birbhum are part of the Red corridor. However, as of July 2016, there has been no reported incidents of Maoist related activities from these districts for the previous 4 years. In the period 2009-2011 LWE violence resulted in more than 500 deaths and a similar number missing in Paschim Medinipur district.

The Lalgarh movement, which started attracting attention after the failed assassination attempt on Buddhadeb Bhattacharjee, then chief minister of West Bengal, in the Salboni area of Paschim Medinipur district, on 2 November 2008 and the police action that followed, had also spread over to these areas. The movement was not just a political struggle but an armed struggle that concurrently took the look of a social struggle. A large number of CPI (M) activists, and others active in different political parties, were killed. Although the epi-centre of the movement was Lalgarh, it was spread across 19 police stations in three adjoining districts – Paschim Medinipur, Bankura and Purulia, all thickly forested and near the border with Jharkhand. The deployment of CRPF and other forces started on 11 June 2009. The movement came to an end after the 2011 state assembly elections and change of government in West Bengal. The death of Kishenji, the Maoist commander, on 24 November 2011 was the last major landmark.

From 2009 Maoist violence had rapidly spread across eleven western CD blocks of the district: Binpur I, Binpur II, Salboni, Grahbeta II, Jamboni, Jhargram, Midnapore Sadar, Gopiballavpur I, Gopiballavpur II, Sankrail and Nayagram.

== Geography ==
In Gopiballavpur II CD block 55% of the cultivated area has infertile lateritic soil and 45% has alluvial soil. Gopiballavpur II CD Block is drought prone with a particularly severe drought situation.

Chorchita, a constituent gram panchayat of Gopiballavpur II block is located at 22°13′30″N 86°57′38″E.

Gopiballavpur II CD block is bounded by Jamboni and Jhargram CD blocks in the north, Sankrail CD block in the east, Gopiballavpur I CD block in the south and Chakulia and Baharagora CD blocks, in East Singhbhum district in Jharkhand, in the west.

It is located 51 km from Midnapore, the district headquarters.

Gopiballavpur II CD block has an area of 192.17 km^{2}. It has 1 panchayat samity, 7 gram panchayats, 78 gram sansads (village councils), 192 mouzas and 175 inhabited villages. Beliaberah police station serves this block. Headquarters of this CD block is at Beliaberah (Belaberya).

Gopiballavpur II CD block had a forest cover of 1,110 hectares, against a total geographical area of 19,777 hectares in 2005-06.

Gram panchayats of Gopiballavpur II block/ panchayat samiti are: Beliaberah, Chorchita, Kharbandhi, Kuliana, Nota, Petnindhi and Tapsia.

== Demographics ==
=== Population ===
According to the 2011 Census of India, Gopiballavpur II CD block had a total population of 104,996, all of which were rural. There were 53,459 (51%) males and 51,537 (49%) females. Population in the age range 0–6 years was 11,851. Scheduled Castes numbered 32,553 (31.00%) and Scheduled Tribes numbered 24,562 (23.39%).

According to the 2001 census, Gopiballavpur II block had a total population of 93,276, out of which 47,813 were males and 45,463 were females. Gopiballavpur II block registered a population growth of 13.64 per cent during the 1991-2001 decade. Decadal growth for the combined Midnapore district was 14.87 per cent. Decadal growth in West Bengal was 17.45 per cent.

Large villages (with 4,000+ population) in Gopiballavpur II CD block are (2011 census figures in brackets): Chorchita (4,383).

Other villages in Gopiballavpur II CD block include (2011 census figures in brackets): Petbindhi (3,847), Tapsia (1,779), Nota (974), Kuliana (1,777) and Belaberya (1,685).

=== Literacy ===
According to the 2011 census, the total number of literate persons in Gopiballavpur II CD block was 66,503 (71.40% of the population over 6 years) out of which males numbered 38,092 (80.45% of the male population over 6 years) and females numbered 28,411 (62.05% of the female population over 6 years). The gender gap in literacy rates was 18.41%.

See also – List of West Bengal districts ranked by literacy rate

Literacy in CD blocks of
Paschim Medinipur district
Jhargram subdivision
Binpur I – 69.74%
Binpur II – 70.46%
Gopiballavpur I – 65.44%
Gopiballavpur II – 71.40%
Jamboni – 72.63%
Jhargram – 72.23%
Nayagram – 63.70%
Sankrail – 73.35%
Medinipur Sadar subdivision
Garhbeta I – 72.21%
Garhbeta II – 75.87%
Garhbeta III – 73.42%
Keshpur – 77.88%
Midnapore Sadar – 70.48%
Salboni – 74.87%
Ghatal subdivision
Chandrakona I – 78.93%
Chandrakona II – 75.96%
Daspur I – 83.99%
Daspur II – 85.62%
Ghatal – 81.08%
Kharagpur subdivision
Dantan I – 73.53%
Dantan II – 82.45%
Debra – 82.03%
Keshiari – 76.78%
Kharagpur I – 77.06%
Kharagpur II – 76.08%
Mohanpur – 80.51%
Narayangarh – 78.31%
Pingla – 83.57%
Sabang – 86.84%
2011 Census: CD Block Wise

Primary Census Abstract Data

=== Language and religion ===
Religion in Gopiballavpur II CD block (2011)
Hinduism	97.26%
Islam	1.06%
Other (tribal religion)	1.05%
Other or not stated	0.63%

In the 2011 census Hindus numbered 102,125 and formed 97.26% of the population in Gopiballavpur II CD block. Muslims numbered 1,108 and formed 1.06% of the population. Others numbered 1,763 and formed 1.68% of the population. Others include Addi Bassi, Marang Boro, Santal, Saranath, Sari Dharma, Sarna, Alchchi, Bidin, Sant, Saevdharm, Seran, Saran, Sarin, Kheria, Christian and other religious communities. In 2001, Hindus were 98.07%, Muslims 0.63% and tribal religions 0.82% of the population respectively.

Languages of Gopiballavpur II CD block (2011)
1. Bengali (84.8%)
2. Santali (9.89%)
3. Mundari (3.31%)
4. 'Other' Hindi (1.21%)
5. Others (0.83%)

At the time of the 2011 census, 84.76% of the population spoke Bengali, 9.89% Santali and 3.31% Mundari as their first language. 1.21% of the population spoke 'Others' under Hindi.

== BPL families ==
In Gopiballavpur II CD block 47.72% families were living below poverty line in 2007.

According to the District Human Development Report of Paschim Medinipur: The 29 CD blocks of the district were classified into four categories based on the poverty ratio. Nayagram, Binpur II and Jamboni CD blocks have very high poverty levels (above 60%). Kharagpur I, Kharagpur II, Sankrail, Garhbeta II, Pingla and Mohanpur CD blocks have high levels of poverty (50-60%), Jhargram, Midnapore Sadar, Dantan I, Gopiballavpur II, Binpur I, Dantan II, Keshiari, Chandrakona I, Gopiballavpur I, Chandrakona II, Narayangarh, Keshpur, Ghatal, Sabang, Garhbeta I, Salboni, Debra and Garhbeta III CD blocks have moderate levels of poverty (25-50%) and Daspur II and Daspur I CD blocks have low levels of poverty (below 25%).

== Economy ==
=== Infrastructure ===
175 or 91% of mouzas in Gopiballavpur II CD block were electrified by 31 March 2014.

175 mouzas in Gopiballavpur II CD block had drinking water facilities in 2013-14. There were 52 fertiliser depots, 9 seed stores and 40 fair price shops in the CD block.

=== Agriculture ===
Persons engaged in agriculture
in Gopiballavpur II CD block
1. Bargadars (5.03%)
2. Patta holders (33.3%)
3. Small farmers (2.00%)
4. Marginal farmers (17.6%)
5. Agricultural labourers (42.1%)

Although the Bargadari Act of 1950 recognised the rights of bargadars to a higher share of crops from the land that they tilled, it was not implemented fully. Large tracts, beyond the prescribed limit of land ceiling, remained with the rich landlords. From 1977 onwards major land reforms took place in West Bengal. Land in excess of land ceiling was acquired and distributed amongst the peasants. Following land reforms land ownership pattern has undergone transformation. In 2013-14, persons engaged in agriculture in Gopiballavpur II CD block could be classified as follows: bargadars 5.03%, patta (document) holders 33.27%, small farmers (possessing land between 1 and 2 hectares) 2.00%, marginal farmers (possessing land up to 1 hectare) 17.61% and agricultural labourers 42.09%.

In 2005-06 gross cropped area in Gopiballavpur II CD block was 29,020 hectares and the area in which more than one crop was grown was 13,455 hectares.

The extension of irrigation has played a role in growth of the predominantly agricultural economy. In 2013-14, the total area irrigated in Gopiballavpur II CD block was 4,500 hectares, out of which 200 hectares were irrigated by tank water, 125 hectares by deep tubewells, 4,000 hectares by shallow tube wells, 125 hectares by river lift irrigation and 55 hectares by open dug wells.

In 2013-14, Gopiballavpur II CD block produced 65,765 tonnes of Aman paddy, the main winter crop, from 30,753 hectares, 6,276 tonnes of Aus paddy (summer crop) from 2,773 hectares, 2,935 tonnes of Boro paddy (spring crop) from 951 hectares, 1,617 tonnes of wheat from 562 hectares and 191,902 tonnes of potatoes from 5,024 hectares. It also produced pulses and oilseeds.

=== Banking ===
In 2013-14, Gopiballavpur II CD block had offices of 8 commercial banks.

== Transport ==
Gaopiballavpur II CD block has 8 originating/ terminating bus routes. The nearest railway station is 42 km from the CD block headquarters.

State Highway 9 running from Durgapur (in Paschim Bardhaman district) to Nayagram (in Jhargram district) passes through this CD block.

== Education ==
In 2013-14, Gopiballavpur II CD block had 135 primary schools with 7,237 students, 13 middle schools with 1,366 students, 3 high schools with 3,411 students and 14 higher secondary schools with 10,449 students. Gopiballavpur II CD block had 254 institutions for special and non-formal education with 7,703 students.

The United Nations Development Programme considers the combined primary and secondary enrolment ratio as the simple indicator of educational achievement of the children in the school going age. The infrastructure available is important. In Gopiballavpur II CD block out of the total 135 primary schools in 2008-2009, 114 had pucca buildings, 5 partially pucca, 2 kucha and 14 multiple type.

Government General Degree College, Gopiballavpur-II, established in 2015, is the only general degree college in this block.

== Healthcare ==
In 2014, Gopiballavpur II CD block had 1 rural hospital and 3 primary health centres with total 52 beds and 5 doctors. It had 22 family welfare sub centres and 1 family welfare centre. 6,901 patients were treated indoor and 104,518 patients were treated outdoor in the hospitals, health centres and subcentres of the CD block.

Tapsia Rural Hospital, with 30 beds at Tapsia, is a major government medical facility in the Gopiballavpur II CD block. There are primary health centres at: Tentulia (PO Jahanpur) (with 10 beds), Ramchandrapur (PO Kharbandhi) (with 6 beds) and Nota (PO Dhandangri) (with 6 beds).
