= Khagendra Nath Mahata =

Indian politician

Member of the West Bengal Legislative Assembly
- In office 2 May 2021 – 2026
- Preceded by: Churamani Mahato
- Succeeded by: Rajesh Mahata
- Constituency: Gopiballavpur

Personal details
- Party: Bharatiya Janata Party
- Other political affiliations: All India Trinamool Congress (till April 2026)
- Profession: Politician

Khagendra Nath Mahata is an Indian politician. In May 2021, he was elected as the member of the West Bengal Legislative Assembly from Gopiballavpur (Vidhan Sabha constituency).

== Personal life ==
Mahata is from Jhargram. His father's name is Tarendra Nath Mahata. He has passed MBBS From R.G. Kar Medical College in 2007.

== Electoral Performance ==
West Bengal Legislative Assembly
Year	Constituency	Party	Votes	%	Opponent	Opponent party	Votes	%	Margin	Margin in %	Result
2021	Gopiballavpur	TMC	104,115	52%	Sanjit Mahato	BJP	80,347	40.00	23,768	12%	Won
