= Kharikamathani =

Kharikamathani Kharika Mathani
- Village
- Location in West Bengal, India Kharikamathani (India)
- Coordinates: 22.0109°N 87.1441°E
- Country: India
- State: West Bengal
- District: Paschim Medinipur

Population (2011)
  - Total: 2,002

Languages
  - Official: Bengali, Santali, English
- Time zone: UTC+5:30 (IST)
- PIN: 721159
- Telephone/STD code: 03229
- Lok Sabha constituency: Jhargram
- Vidhan Sabha constituency: Nayagram
- Website: jhargram.gov.in

Kharikamathani (also written as Kharika Mathani) is a village and a gram panchayat in the Nayagram CD block in the Jhargram subdivision of the Jhargram district in the state of West Bengal, India.

== Geography ==
Cities and towns in Jhargram subdivision of Jhargram district
CT: census town, R: rural/ urban centre, H: historical/ religious centre
Owing to space constraints in the small map, the actual locations in a larger map may vary slightly

=== Location ===
Kharikamathani is located at 22.0109°N 87.1441°E.

A bridge across the Subarnarekha River at Bhasraghat, connecting Keshiary and Nayagram CD blocks, was inaugurated by Mamata Banerjee, Chief Minister of West Bengal, on 10 February 2016.

=== Area overview ===
Jhargram subdivision, the only one in Jhargram district, shown in the map alongside, is composed of hills, mounds and rolling lands. It is rather succinctly described in the District Human Development Report, 2011 (at that time it was part of Paschim Medinipur district), "The western boundary is more broken and picturesque, for the lower ranges of the Chhotanagpur Hills line the horizon, the jungle assumes the character of forest, and large trees begin to predominate. The soil, however, is lateritic, a considerable area is unproductive, almost uninhabited, especially in the extreme north-west where there are several hills over 1000 feet in height. The remainder of the country is an almost level plain broken only by the sand hills." 3.48% of the population lives in urban areas and 96.52% lives in the rural areas. 20.11% of the total population belonged to scheduled castes and 29.37% belonged to scheduled tribes.

Note: The map alongside presents some of the notable locations in the subdivision. All places marked in the map are linked in the larger full screen map.

== Demographics ==
According to the 2011 Census of India, Kharika Mathani had a total population of 2,002, of which 1,011 (50%) were males and 991 (50%) were females. There were 194 persons in the age range of 0–6 years. The total number of literate persons in Kharika Mathani was 1,519 (84.02% of the population over 6 years).

== Infrastructure ==
Kharikamathani Rural Hospital, with 30 beds at Kharikamathani, is the major government medical facility in Nayagram CD block.
