= Kultikri =

- Village
- Location in West Bengal, India Kultikri (India)
- Coordinates: 22°10′56.3″N 87°09′34.6″E
- Country: India
- State: West Bengal
- District: Jhargram

Population (2011)
  - Total: 4,797

Languages
  - Official: Bengali, Santali, English
- Time zone: UTC+5:30 (IST)
- Lok Sabha constituency: Jhargram
- Vidhan Sabha constituency: Gopiballavpur
- Website: jhargram.gov.in

Kultikri is a village, in Sankrail CD Block in Jhargram subdivision of Jhargram district in the state of West Bengal, India.

== Geography ==
Cities and towns in Jhargram subdivision of Jhargram district
CT: census town, R: rural/ urban centre, H: historical/ religious centre
Owing to space constraints in the small map, the actual locations in a larger map may vary slightly

=== Location ===
Kultikri is located at 22°10′56.3″N 87°09′34.6″E.

=== Area overview ===
Jhargram subdivision, the only one in Jhargram district, shown in the map alongside, is composed of hills, mounds and rolling lands. It is rather succinctly described in the District Human Development Report, 2011 (at that time it was part of Paschim Medinipur district), “The western boundary is more broken and picturesque, for the lower ranges of the Chhotanagpur Hills line the horizon, the jungle assumes the character of forest, and large trees begin to predominate. The soil, however, is lateritic, a considerable area is unproductive, almost uninhabited, especially in the extreme north-west where there are several hills over 1000 feet in height. The remainder of the country is an almost level plain broken only by the sand hills.” 3.48% of the population lives in urban areas and 96.52% lives in the rural areas. 20.11% of the total population belonged to scheduled castes and 29.37% belonged to scheduled tribes.

Note: The map alongside presents some of the notable locations in the subdivision. All places marked in the map are linked in the larger full screen map.

== Demographics ==
According to the 2011 Census of India, Kultikri had a total population of 1797 of which 907 (50%) were males and 890 (50%) were females. Population in the age range 0–6 years was 89. The total number of literate persons in Kultikri was 622 (78.04% of the population over 6 years).

== Transport ==
Kultikri is on the Rogra-Hatigeria Road which meets State Highway 5 at Hatigeria. The Guptamoni-Kultikri Road and the Kultikri-Poradiha Road, both meet National Highway 49, converge on the village. More over, another two PMGSY roads which connect two corner sides.

Kultikri is well connected with Midnapore, Jhargram, Digha by bus. South Bengal State Transport Corporation operates one bus from Durgapur to Kultikri Via Bankura, Raipur, Silda, Jhargram & one bus from Kolkata to Rohini Via Santragachi, Uluberia, Bagnan, Kolaghat, Debra, Kharagpur. South Bengal State Transport Corporation

== Education ==
Sankrail Anil Biswas Smriti Mahavidyalaya was established in 2007 and is affiliated to Vidyasagar University. It offers arts courses with honours in English, Bengali, Sanskrit, Santali, history and political science.

Kultikri Teachers' Training Institute of Higher Studies is also a D.El.Ed. Cum B.Ed. training Institute affiliated to West Bengal University of Teachers' Training, Education Planning and Administration

There are several high schools here for school level education, including the notable Kultikri Girls' High School and Kultikri S.C. High School(established 1945). The latter is one of the oldest and most renowned schools in this area as well as the district.
