= Jhargram subdivision =

Jhargram Sadar Subdivision
- Subdivision
- Interactive map of Jhargram Sadar Subdivision
- Coordinates: 22.45°N 86.98°E
- Country: India
- State: West Bengal
- District: Jhargram
- Headquarters: Jhargram

Area
  - Total: 3,037.64 km^{2} (1,172.84 sq mi)

Population (2011)
  - Total: 1,136,548
  - Density: 374.155/km^{2} (969.057/sq mi)

Languages
  - Official: Bengali, English
- Time zone: UTC+5:30 (IST)
- ISO 3166 code: IN-WB
- Vehicle registration: WB
- Website: wb.gov.in

Jhargram Sadar Subdivision is an administrative Subdivision (till now only Subdivision) of the Jhargram district in the state of West Bengal, India. It became part of the Jhargram district from 4 April 2017 after splitting from the Paschim Medinipur district.

== History ==
Jhargram subdivision was created in 1922 with the police stations at Jhargram, Gopiballavpur and Binpur.

== Geography ==

Cities and towns in Jhargram subdivision of Jhargram district
CT: census town, R: rural/ urban centre, H: historical/ religious centre
Owing to space constraints in the small map, the actual locations in a larger map may vary slightly

Jhargram subdivision covers an area of 3,037.64 km^{2} and had a population of 1,136,548 in the 2011 census. 96.52% of the total population was rural and only 3.48% was urban population. 20.11% of the total population belonged to scheduled castes and 29.37% belonged to scheduled tribes.

Jhargram subdivision has 10 police stations, 8 community development blocks, 8 panchayat samitis, 79 gram panchayats, 2,996 mouzas, 2513 inhabited villages, 1 municipality and 1 census town. The single municipality is at Jhargram. The census town is Silda. The subdivision has its headquarters at Jhargram.

== Gram panchayats ==
The subdivision contains 79 gram panchayats under 8 community development blocks:

- Binpur I block: Andharia, Binpur, Lalgarh, Sijua, Baita, Dahijuri, Nepura, Belatikri, Dharampur and Ramgarh.
- Binpur II block: Banspahari, Bhulaveda, Kanko, Shimulpal, Belpahari, Ergoda, Sandapara, Bhelaidiha, Harda and Shilda.
- Jamboni block: Chinchra, Dubra, Kapgari, Parihati, Chilkigarh, Gidhni, Kendadangri, Dharsa, Jamboni and Lalbandh.
- Jhargram block: Aguiboni, Dudhkundi, Patashimul, Shalboni, Bandhgora, Lodhasuli, Radhanagar, Chandri, Manikpara, Sapdhara, Chubka, Nedabahara and Sardiha.
- Gopiballavpur I block: Alampur, Gopiballavpur, Saria, Shashrha, Amarda, Kendugari and Satma.
- Gopiballavpur II block: Beliaberah, Kharbandhi, Nota, Tapshia, Chorchita, Kuliana and Pet Bindhi.
- Nayagram block: Ara, Baranegui, Chandrarekha, Malam, Baligeria, Berajal, Jamirapal, Nayagram, Barakhakri, Chandabilla, Kharikamathani and Patina.
- Sankrail block: Andhari, Khudmorai, Pathra, Sankrail, Chhatri, Kultikri, Ragrah, Dhanghori, Laudaha and Rohini.

== Police stations ==
Police stations in Jhargram subdivision have the following features and jurisdiction:

Police Station	Area covered km^{2}	Inter-state border	Municipal Town	CD Block
Jhargram	n/a	-	Jhargram	Jhargram
Jhargram Women's	All CD Blocks of Jhargram subdivision	-	-	-
Lalgarh	n/a	-	-	Binpur I
Belpahari	n/a	East Singhbhum district of Jharkhand on the south	-	Binpur II (part)
Binpur	n/a	-	-	Binpur II (part)
Jamboni	n/a	East Singhbhum district of Jharkhand on the south and west	-	Jamboni
Nayagram	n/a	Balasore district of Odisha on the east, Mayurbhanj district of Odisha on the south and west	-	Nayagram
Sankrail	n/a	-	-	Sankrail
Gopiballavpur	n/a	Mayurbhanj district of Odisha on the south and East Singhbhum district of Jharkhand on the west	-	Gopiballavpur I
Beliaberah	n/a	East Singhbhum district of Jharkhand on the west	-	Gopiballavpur II

== Blocks ==
Community development blocks in Jhargram subdivision are:

CD Block	Headquarters	Area km^{2}	Population (2011)	Rural population (2011) %	Urban population (2011) %	SC %	ST %	Literacy rate %	Census Towns
Jhargram	Jhargram	515.11	170,097	23.45	76.55	14.83	22.71	72.23	1
Binpur I	Lalgarh	357.62	156,153	100	-	25.02	28.15	69.74	-
Binpur II	Belpahari	583.50	164,522	96.52	3.48	15.77	39.95	70.46	1
Jamboni	Gidhni	318.83	113,197	100	-	18.10	28.60	72.63	-
Nayagram	Baligeria	501.44	142,199	100	-	20.32	40.01	63.70	-
Sankrail	Rohini	276.80	115,418	100	-	18.20	24.97	73.35	-
Gopiballavpur I	Chhatinasol	275.83	108,254	100	-	27.18	34.01	65.44	-
Gopiballavpur II	Beliaberah	192.17	104,996	100	-	31.00	23.39	71.40	-

== Education ==
Jhargram subdivision had a literacy rate of 70.92% in 2011.

The table below gives a comprehensive picture of the block-wise-wise education scenario in Jhargram subdivision for the year 2013-14:

CD Block/ Municipality	Primary School		Middle School		High School		Higher Secondary School		General College, Univ		Technical / Professional Instt		Non-formal Education	
CD Block/ Municipality	Institution	Student	Institution	Student	Institution	Student	Institution	Student	Institution	Student	Institution	Student	Institution	Student
Jhargram CD Block	200	10,801	31	1,815	4	1,690	17	16,875	1	934	3	1,019	440	15,130
Jhargram municipality	26	3,906	2	144	2	1,148	8	8,310	1	1032	4	1,174	2	118
Binpur I	137	9,247	20	1,679	-		16	16,020	-	-	-	-	510	10,896
Binpur II	190	11,767	26	1,255	-	-	21	17,450	1	751	-	-	565	13,687
Jamboni	114	7,947	17	801	-	-	16	11,375	1	670	1	50	272	6,994
Nayagram	164	9,046	24	1,355	-	-	20	14,309	-	-	-	-	525	12,180
Sankrail	153	6,776	26	1,552	-	-	14	10,365	1	704	-	-	275	8,496
Gopiballavpur I	131	6,952	29	805	-	-	12	12,925	1	1,240	1	100	289	8,126
Gopiballavpur II	135	7,237	13	1,366	3	3,411	14	10,449	-	-	-	-	254	7,703
Jhargram subdivision	1,250	73,679	188	10,772	9	6,249	138	118,078	6	5,331	9	2,343	3,132	83,330

Note: Primary schools include junior basic schools; middle schools, high schools and higher sNecondary schools include madrasahs; technical schools include junior technical schools, junior government polytechnics, industrial technical institutes, industrial training centres, nursing training institutes etc.; technical and professional colleges include engineering colleges, medical colleges, para-medical institutes, management colleges, teachers training and nursing training colleges, law colleges, art colleges, music colleges etc. Special and non-formal education centres include sishu siksha kendras, madhyamik siksha kendras, adult high schools, centres of Rabindra mukta vidyalaya, recognised Sanskrit tols, institutions for the blind and other handicapped persons, Anganwadi centres, reformatory schools etc.

The following institutions are located in Jhargram subdivision:

- Sadhu Ramchand Murmu University of Jhargram at Jhargram was established in 2017.
- Jhargram Raj College at Jhargram was established in 1949.
- Vivekananda Satavarshiki Mahavidyalaya was established in 1964 at Manikpara.
- Lalgarh Government College was established in 2014 at Lalgarh.
- Silda Chandra Sekhar College was established in 1971 at Silda.
- Seva Bharati Mahavidyalaya at Kapgari was established in 1964.
- Nayagram Pandit Raghunath Murmu Government College was established in 2014 at Baligeria.
- Sankrail Anil Biswas Smriti Mahavidyalaya was established at Kultikri in 2007.
- Subarnarekha Mahavidyalaya was established at Gopiballavpur in 1988.

== Healthcare ==
In 2017, Jhargram subdivision has been declared as a health district to improve the healthcare system. The table below (all data in numbers) presents a subdivision-wise overview of the medical facilities available and patients treated in the hospitals, health centres and sub-centres in 2014 in Paschim Medinipur district.

CD Block/ Municipality	Health & Family Welfare Deptt, WB				Other State Govt Deptts	Local bodies	Central Govt Deptts / PSUs	NGO / Private Nursing Homes	Total	Total Number of Beds	Total Number of Doctors	Indoor Patients	Outdoor Patients
CD Block/ Municipality	Hospitals	Rural Hospitals	Block Primary Health Centres	Primary Health Centres	Other State Govt Deptts	Local bodies	Central Govt Deptts / PSUs	NGO / Private Nursing Homes	Total	Total Number of Beds	Total Number of Doctors	Indoor Patients	Outdoor Patients
Jhargram CD Block	-	-	1	4	-	-	-	1	6	52	9*	2,727	89,581
Jhargram municipality	1	-	-	-	-	-	-	-	6	7*	368	28,963	322,063
Binpur I	-	1	-	5	-	-	-	-	6	96	9*	7,066	121,258
Binpur II	-	1	-	3	-	-	-	-	4	86	10*	8,966	107,833
Jamboni	-	-	1	2	-	-	-	-	3	31	5*	3,106	80,593
Nayagram	-	1	-	3	-	-	-	-	4	52	7*	5,749	73,848
Sankrail	-	1	-	2	-	-	-	-	3	51	3*	4,954	46,393
Gopiballavpur I	-	1	-	3	-	-	-	-	4	50	5*	5,264	87,323
Gopiballavpur II	-	1	-	3	-	-	-	-	4	52	5*	6,901	104,518
Jhargram subdivision	1	6	2	25	-	-	-	7	41	838	87*	73,696	1,033,410

- Excluding Nursing Homes

=== Medical facilities ===
Medical facilities in the Jhargram subdivision are as follows:

Hospitals: (Name, location, beds)

- Jhargram Subdivisional Hospital, Jhargram (M), 265 beds

Rural Hospitals: (Name, CD block, location, beds)

- Binpur Rural Hospital, Binpur I CD block, Binpur, 30 beds
- Belpahari Rural Hospital, Binpur II CD block, Belpahari, 30 beds
- Kharikamathani Rural Hospital, Nayagram CD block, Kharikamathani, 30 beds
- Bhangagarh Rural Hospital, Sankrail CD block, Bhanga Gar, PO Keshiapata, 30 beds
- Gopiballavpur Rural Hospital, Gopiballavpur I CD block, Gopiballavpur, 30 beds
- Tapsia Rural Hospital, Gopiballavpur II CD block, Topsia, 30 beds

Block Primary Health Centres: (Name, CD block, location, beds)

- Mohanpur Block Primary Health Centre, Jhargram CD block, Montipa-Mohanpur, 10 beds
- Chilkigarh Block Primary Health Centre, Jambani CD block, Chilkigarh, 15 beds

Primary Health Centres : (CD block-wise)(CD block, PHC location, beds)

- Jhargram CD block: Lauriadam (PO Rajabas) (10), Manikpara (10), Chubka (PO Khalseuli) (6), Chandri (6)
- Binpur I CD block: Laghata (PO Nachipore) (4)
- Binpur II CD block: Ergoda (PO Ashakanthi) (6), Odulchuan (10), Silda (6)
- Jambani CD block: Chinchira (10), Kapgari (6)
- Nayagram CD block:Chandabila (10), Jamirapal (6), Baligeria (6)
- Sankrail CD block: Pathra (6), Kultikri (10)
- Gopiballavpur I CD block: Sasra (10), Alampur (6), Dhansole (4)
- Gopiballavpur II CD block: Tentulia (PO Jahanpur) (10), Ramchandrapur (PO Kharbandhi) (6), Nota (PO Dhandangri) (6)

== Electoral constituencies ==
Lok Sabha (parliamentary) and Vidhan Sabha (state assembly) constituencies in Jhargram district were as follows from 2006:

Lok Sabha constituency	Vidhan Sabha constituency	District	Reservation	CD Block and/or Gram panchayats
Jhargram (ST)	Nayagram	Jhargram	ST	Nayagram and Gopiballavpur I CD Blocks, and Chorchita, Kuliana and Nota GPs of Gopiballavpur II CD Block.
	Gopiballavpur	Jhargram	None	Beliabera, Kharbandhi, Pet Bindhi and Tapshia GPs of Gopiballavpur II CD Block, Aguiboni, Chandri, Chubka, Dudhkundi, Lodhasuli, Nedabahara, Patashimul, Shalboni and Sardiha GPs of Jhargram CD Block and Sankrail CD Block.
	Jhargram	Jhargram	None	Jhargram municipality, Bandhgora, Manikpara, Radhanagar and Sapdhara GPs of Jhargram CD Block and Binpur I CD Block.
	Garbeta	Paschim Medinipur	None	Garhbeta I CD Block and Amlasuli, Jogardanga, Piyasala and Sarboth GPs of Garhbeta II CD Block.
	Salboni	Paschim Medinipur	None	Bhimpur, Bishnupur, Debgram, Lalgeria and Salboni GPs of Salboni CD Block, Goaltor, Gohaldanga, Jeerapara, Makli, Patharpara and Pingbani GPs of Garhbeta II CD Block and Garhbeta III CD Block.
	Binpur	Jhargram	None	Binpur II and Jamboni CD Blocks.
	Bandwan	Purulia	ST	Bandwan, Barabazar and Manbazar II CD Block.
