= Rohini, West Bengal =

Rohini
- Village
- Rohini
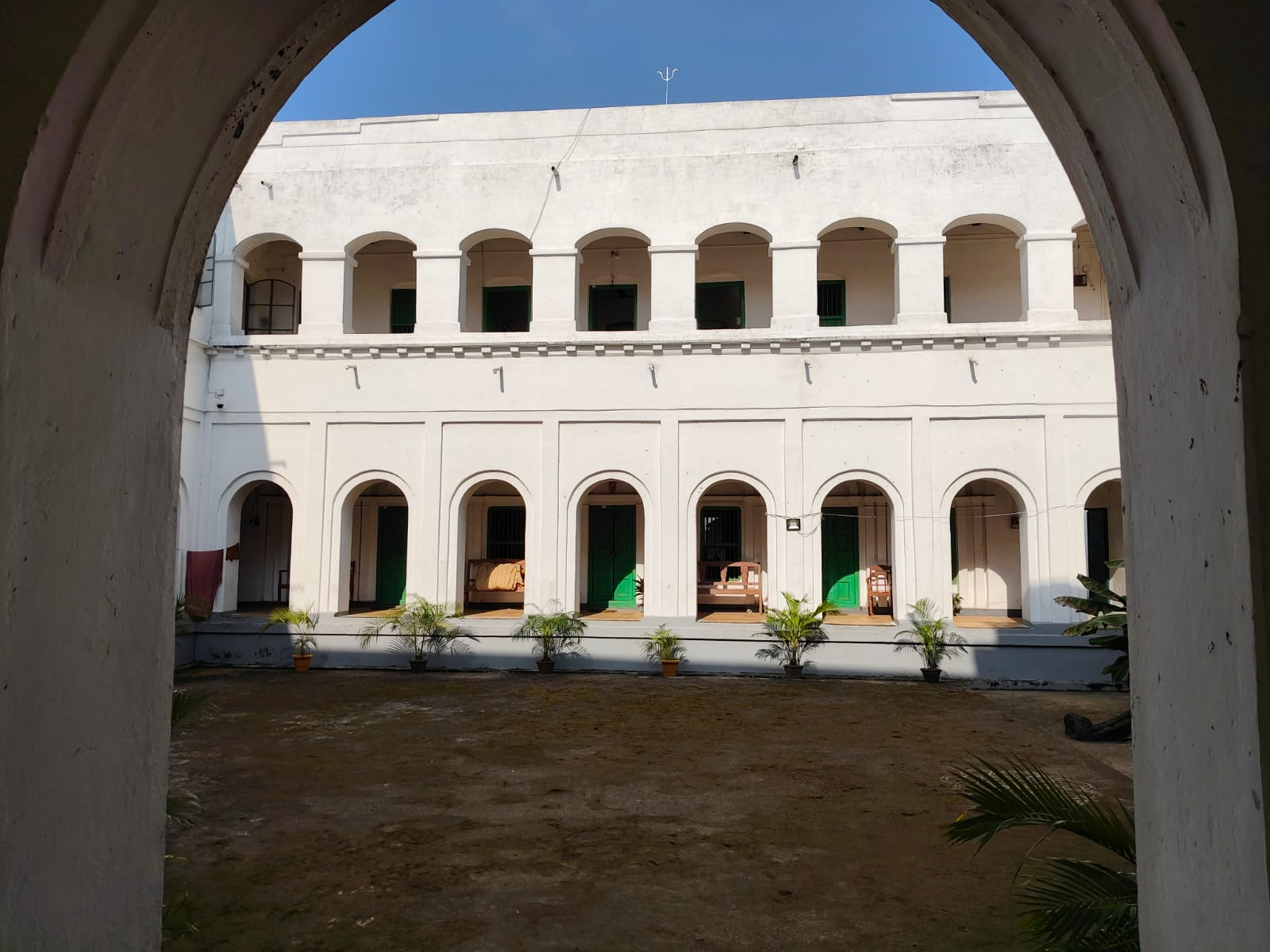
- Rohini, Jhargram

- Location in West Bengal, India Rohini (India)
- Coordinates: 22°10′10.6″N 87°05′58.8″E
- Country: India
- State: West Bengal
- District: Jhargram
- Established: 18 century

Population (2011)
  - Total: 1,691

Languages
  - Official: Bengali, Santali, English
- Time zone: UTC+5:30 (IST)
- Lok Sabha constituency: Jhargram
- Vidhan Sabha constituency: Gopiballavpur
- Website: jhargram.gov.in

Rohini is a village and a gram panchayat in the Sankrail CD block in the Jhargram subdivision of the Jhargram district, in the state of West Bengal, India.

== History ==
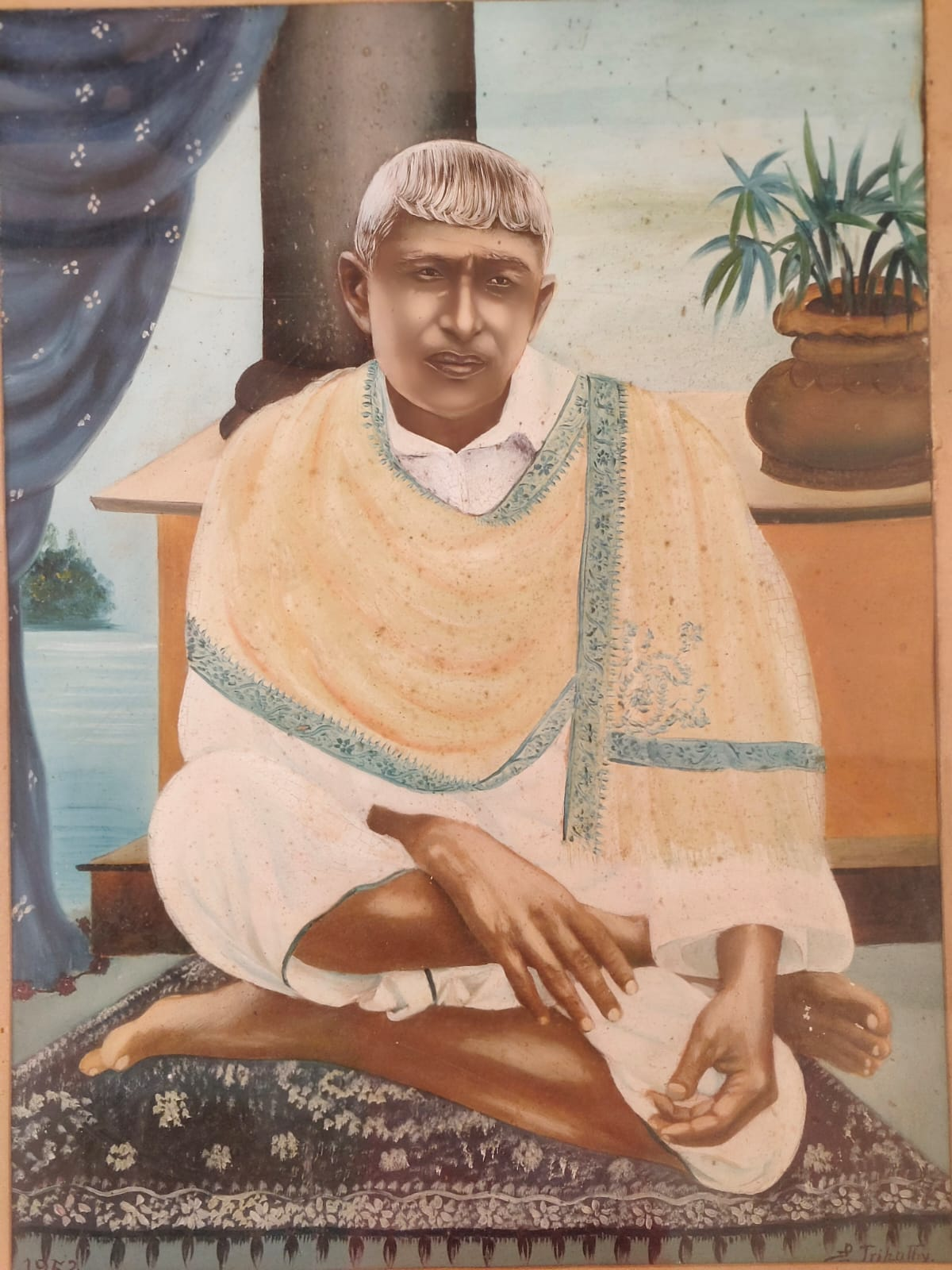
Babu Chowdhury Lakhsmi Narayan Sharangi, Zamindar of Rohini

Around 700 years ago, Rohini was ruled by some small Bhunia Rajas whose capital was known as Rohini Garh. Their kingdom covered approximately 6-7 square kilometers. According to some ancient texts, around 500 years ago Kshatriya Pattanayak zamindars (local king) ruled in this region under the Rajas of Mayurbhanj. In Rasik Mangal, written by Gopijan Ballav Das in 1655, Achyutananda Pattanayek is mentioned as the king of Mallabhum (old name of Rohini and its surrounding area of approx. 7 square kilometers. This Mallabhum was distinct from the Mallabhum of Bishnupur). Raja Achyutananda Pattanayek and his wife Rani Bhabani Devi were the parents of the great Vaishnaba saint Rasikananda Mahaprabhu who was born in 1590. After Rasikananda left his father's kingdom in Rohini and settled in Gopiballapur for spiritual activities, Rohini gradually became abandoned. Subsequently, this area came under the zamindari of Rani Shiromani of Karnagrarh as a forest pargana. In the late 18th century Nimcharan Sharangi got this zamindari of 8000 bighas from the Maharaja of Mayurbhanj and marked the beginning of Sharangi zamindari. Nimcharan's middle son, Chowdhury Sundar Narayan Sharangi left his father's house because of a massive family dispute and established his own zamindari in 1859. But soon Sundar Narayan's zamindari became the principal and prominent zamindari of Rohini Garh while the zamindari of Chowdhury Purnananda Sharangi, Nimcharan's eldest son, gradually declined. Babu Chowdhary Lakhsmi Narayan Sharangi, son of Chowdhury Akshay Narayan Sharangi & grandson of Chowdhury Sundar Narayan Sharangi of Rohini Garh was the Zamindar of Rohini including other 89 mouzas of 6 Parganas. He was born in 1875 and took his father's zamindari in 1901. He established Rohini Chowdhurani Rukmini Devi(CRD) High school in this village in the memory of his mother Chowdhurani Rukmini Debi on 16 January 1948. He also founded a dispensary (Akshay Narayan Sharangi Databya Chikitsalay) in the memory of his father Chowdhury Akshay Narayan Sharangi and established a leper clinic in this village (1931). James Peddie, the then District Magistrate of undivided Midnapore had come to inaugurate this dispensary. Babu Lakhsmi Narayan Sharangi built Rohineswar Shiv Temple (1910) & a Shitala temple (1909) in this village including many other temples throughout his zamindari. His grandfather had earlier constructed the Pancharanta temple of Radhakantya Jiu as their Kuldevata. Before 1947 Rohini Garh Zamindar shared its boundaries with Jhargram Raja's zamindari, Narayangarh zamindari, Beliaberah's praharaj zamindari, Nayagram zamindari, Narajole zamindari, Monoharpur zamindari. Lakhsmi Narayan Sharangi donated land for government offices and financed the construction of many roads and ponds in this area. He passed away in 1949 at the age of 75.

== Geography ==
Cities and towns in Jhargram subdivision of Jhargram district
CT: census town, R: rural/ urban centre, H: historical/ religious centre
Owing to space constraints in the small map, the actual locations in a larger map may vary slightly

=== Location ===
Rohini is located at 22°10′10.6″N 87°05′58.8″E.

Rohini is situated on the banks of the Dulung River which is connected to the Subarnarekha River.

The Rohini gram panchayat contains the following villages:

- Rohini
- Ranjitpur
- HatiBandhi
- Akashpura
- Praharajpur
- Andhari
- Tentuli

=== Area overview ===
Jhargram subdivision, the only one in Jhargram district, shown in the map alongside, is composed of hills, mounds and rolling lands. It is rather succinctly described in the District Human Development Report, 2011 (at that time it was part of Paschim Medinipur district), “The western boundary is more broken and picturesque, for the lower ranges of the Chhotanagpur Hills line the horizon, the jungle assumes the character of forest, and large trees begin to predominate. The soil, however, is lateritic, a considerable area is unproductive, almost uninhabited, especially in the extreme north-west where there are several hills over 1000 feet in height. The remainder of the country is an almost level plain broken only by the sand hills.” 3.48% of the population lives in urban areas and 96.52% lives in the rural areas. 20.11% of the total population belonged to scheduled castes and 29.37% belonged to scheduled tribes.

Note: The map alongside presents some of the notable locations in the subdivision. All places marked in the map are linked in the larger full screen map.

== Demographics ==
According to the 2011 Census of India, Rohini had a total population of 1,691, of which 876 (52%) were males and 815 (48%) were females. Population in the age range 0–6 years was 174. The total number of literate persons in Rohini was 1,273 (75.28% of the population over 6 years).

== Civic administration ==
=== CD block HQ ===
The headquarters of Sankrail CD block are located at Rohini.

== Education ==
Rohini has the following educational institutions:

- Rohini Junior Basic School
- Rohini C.R.D. High School (HS)
- Rohini Valika Vidyalaya (HS)
- Rohini Morning Star School
- Rohini Merry James Public school
- Shamya Vidyapith

== Culture ==
Rohini is the birthplace of the great saint Rasikananda Mahaprabhu of Vaishnabh religion.

Rohini is known for its cultural heritage and became a centre of education after independence with the help of rohini garh(raj bari). The library, Ramnarayan Pathagar (built in the memory of Ram Narayan Sharangi who was the manager of Nayabasan estate of Mayurbhanj State) has helped many researchers with its rich collection of rare books. Ranjitpur is the birthplace of famous contemporary Bengali poet Late Amar Sarangi.

== Places to visit ==
The following are places of interest in Rohini:

- Rameshwar Temple on the bank of Subarnarekha River
- Rasikananda Mahaprabhu's birthplace & Temple
- Rohini Garh Zamidar bari(The Rohini Garh Palace/ Rajbari), the residence of Zamidar Chowdhary Lakhsmi Narayan Sharangi.
- Ramnarayan Pathagar (Ranjitpur)
- Picnic Spot (kodopal) on the Subarnarekha river bed
- Subarnarekha River Bank
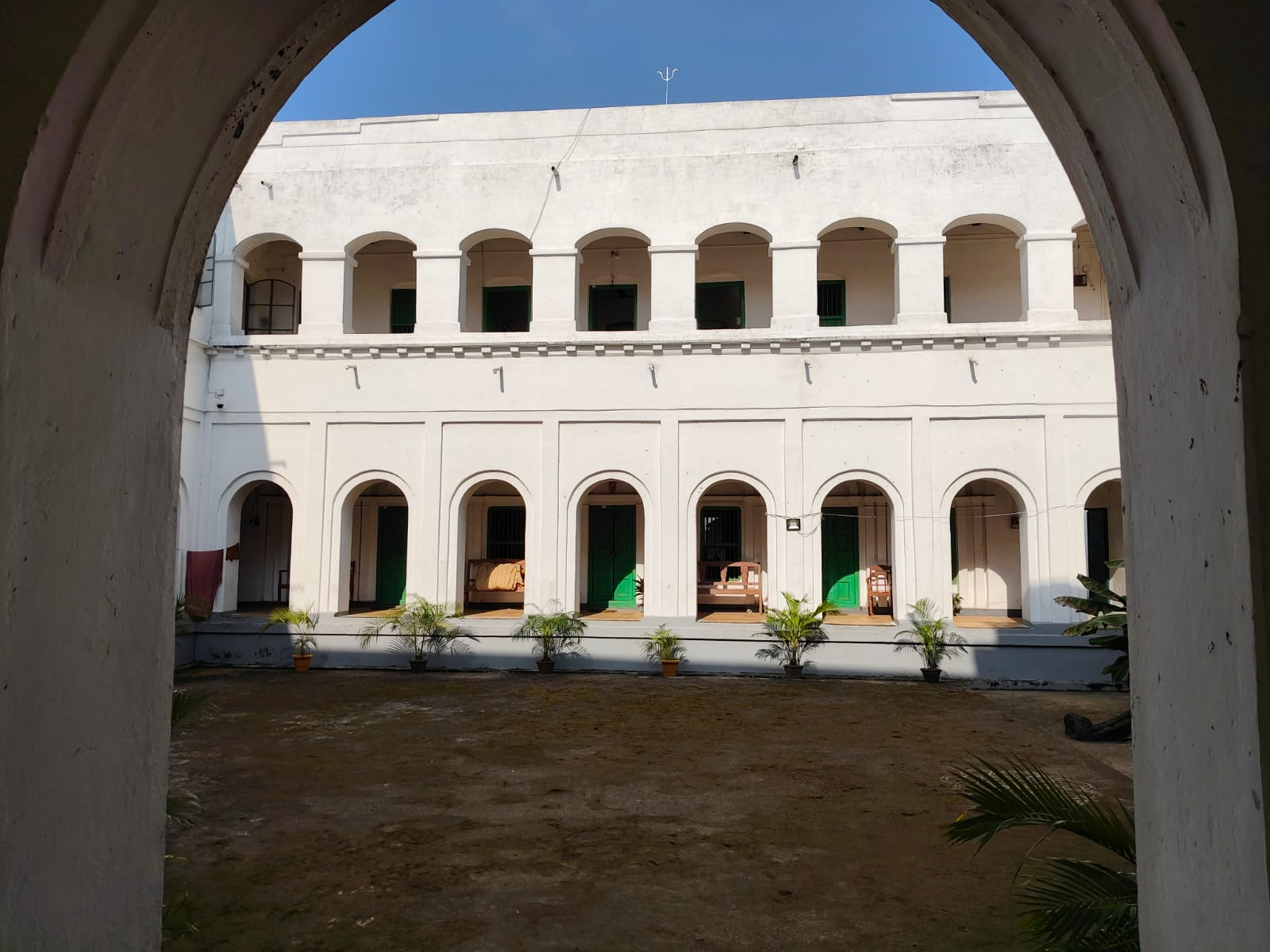
  The Rohini Garh Palace, residence of Ch. Lakhsmi Narayan Sharangi, established 1867
- Bhramargarh - connected to an ancient love story
- Neel Kuthi- although in ruins Rohineswar Shiv and sitala temple, near raj bari
- Pancharatna temple of Radhakantya Jiu of Raj bari
- Ruins of Bhairabh Temple of Rajbar
- Ramchandra Jiu Temple of Rajbari
