= Manikpara =

- Location in West Bengal Manikpara (India)
- Coordinates: 22°22′N 87°07′E
- Country: India
- State: West Bengal
- District: Jhargram
- CD block: Jhargram
- Time zone: UTC+5:30 (IST)

Manikpara is a small village in Jhargram (community development block) in Jhargram subdivision of Jhargram district in West Bengal, India.

Manikpara is a developing small city. It is situated near Sardiha station. Its geographical co-ordinates are 22° 22' 0" North, 87° 7' 0" East.

== Education ==
Vivekananda Satavarshiki Mahavidyalaya was established in 1964 at Manikpara. It is affiliated to Vidyasagar University. It offers courses in Bengali, Santali, English, Sanskrit, history, political science, philosophy, economics, commerce, physics, chemistry and mathematics.
