= Gopiballavpur I =

- Community development block
- Coordinates: 22.2037790°N 86.9604870°E
- Country: India
- State: West Bengal
- District: Jhargram

Government
  - Type: Federal democracy

Area
  - Total: 275.83 km^{2} (106.50 sq mi)
- Elevation: 82 m (269 ft)

Population (2011)
  - Total: 108,254
  - Density: 392.47/km^{2} (1,016.5/sq mi)

Languages
  - Official: Bengali, Santali, English
- Time zone: UTC+5:30 (IST)
- PIN: 721506 (Gopiballavpur)
- Area code: 03221
- Vehicle registration: WB-34
- Literacy: 65.44%
- Lok Sabha constituency: Jhargram
- Vidhan Sabha constituency: Nayagram
- Website: jhargram.gov.in

Gopiballavpur I is a community development block that forms an administrative division in Jhargram subdivision of Jhargram district in the Indian state of West Bengal.

== History ==
=== Naxalite movement in Debra-Gopiballavpur ===
In 1968 many revolutionary intellectuals, broadly termed as Naxalites, settled in Gopiballavpur. Amongst them was Santosh Rana, who was a local person. In September 1969 a guerrilla squad killed an oppressive landlord. The landlords fled to the towns and a big peasant movement began. Landlords’ crops were forcibly harvested. Around 152 people were killed. Santosh Rana was the key figure in virtually “liberating” Debra, Gopiballavpur and neighboring areas in West Bengal, as well as in Odisha and Jharkhand (then it was Bihar). The movement gradually split and collapsed in the early seventies.

=== Red corridor ===
106 districts spanning 10 states across India, described as being a part of the left wing extremism activities, constitutes the Red corridor. In West Bengal the districts of Pashim Medinipur, Bankura, Purulia and Birbhum are part of the Red corridor. However, as of July 2016, there has been no reported incidents of Maoist related activities from these districts for the previous 4 years. In the period 2009-2011 LWE violence resulted in more than 500 deaths and a similar number missing in Paschim Medinipur district.

The Lalgarh movement, which started attracting attention after the failed assassination attempt on Buddhadeb Bhattacharjee, then chief minister of West Bengal, in the Salboni area of Paschim Medinipur district, on 2 November 2008 and the police action that followed, had also spread over to these areas. The movement was not just a political struggle but an armed struggle that concurrently took the look of a social struggle. A large number of CPI (M) activists, and others active in different political parties, were killed. Although the epi-centre of the movement was Lalgarh, it was spread across 19 police stations in three adjoining districts – Paschim Medinipur, Bankura and Purulia, all thickly forested and near the border with Jharkhand. The deployment of CRPF and other forces started on 11 June 2009. The movement came to an end after the 2011 state assembly elections and change of government in West Bengal. The death of Kishenji, the Maoist commander, on 24 November 2011 was the last major landmark.

From 2009 Maoist violence had rapidly spread across eleven western CD blocks of the district: Binpur I, Binpur II, Salboni, Grahbeta II, Jamboni, Jhargram, Midnapore Sadar, Gopiballavpur I, Gopiballavpur II, Sankrail and Nayagram.

== Geography ==
In Gopiballavpur I CD block 60% of the cultivated area has infertile lateritic soil and 40% has alluvial soil. Gopiballavpur I CD block is drought prone with a particularly severe drought situation.

Alampur, a constituent gram panchayat of Gopiballavpur I block is located at 22°12′14″N 86°57′38″E.

Gopiballavpur I CD block is bounded by Gopiballavpur II CD block in the north, Sankrail and Nayagram CD blocks in the east, Koliana and Suliapada CD blocks/tehsils, in Mayurbhanj district in Odisha, in the south and Saraskana CD block/tehsil in Mayurbhanj district and Baharagora CD dlock, in East Singhbhum district in Jharkhand, in the west.

It is located 60 km from Midnapore, the district headquarters.

Gopiballavpur I CD block has an area of 275.83 km^{2}. It has 1 panchayat samity, 7 gram panchayats, 80 gram sansads (village councils), 216 mouzas and 199 inhabited villages. Gopiballavpur police station serves this block. Headquarters of this CD block is at Chhatinasol.

Gopiballavpur I CD block had a forest cover of 5,449 hectares, against a total geographical area of 27,392 hectares in 2005-06.

Gram panchayats of Gopiballavpur I block/ panchayat samiti are: Alampur, Amarda, Gopiballavpur, Kendugari, Saria, Sasra and Satma.

== Demographics ==
=== Population ===
According to the 2011 Census of India, Gopiballavpur I CD block had a total population of 108,254, all of which were rural. There were 55,475 (51%) males and 52,779 (49%) females. Population in the age range 0–6 years was 13,127. Scheduled Castes numbered 29,423 (27.18%) and Scheduled Tribes numbered 36,819 (34.01%).

According to the 2001 census, Gopiballavpur I block had a total population of 94,796, out of which 48,802 were males and 45,994 were females. Gopiballavpur I block registered a population growth of 18.20 per cent during the 1991-2001 decade. Decadal growth for the combined Midnapore district was 14.87 per cent. Decadal growth in West Bengal was 17.45 per cent.

Large villages (with 4,000+ population) in Gopiballavpur I CD block are (2011 census figures in brackets): Gopiballavpur (4,061) and Nayabasan (4,828).

Other villages in Gopiballavpur I CD block include (2011 census figures in brackets): Alampur Pirasimul (2,862), Saria (629), Sasara (3,418), Amarda (869), Satma (Kortir) (1,390), Kenduageria (1,401) and Chhatinasol (1,040).

=== Literacy ===
According to the 2011 census, the total number of literate persons in Gopiballavpur I CD block was 62,248 (65.44% of the population over 6 years) out of which males numbered 36,620 (75.11% of the male population over 6 years) and females numbered 25,628 (55.26% of the female population over 6 years). The gender gap in literacy rates was 19.85%.

See also – List of West Bengal districts ranked by literacy rate

Literacy in CD blocks of
Paschim Medinipur district
Jhargram subdivision
Binpur I – 69.74%
Binpur II – 70.46%
Gopiballavpur I – 65.44%
Gopiballavpur II – 71.40%
Jamboni – 72.63%
Jhargram – 72.23%
Nayagram – 63.70%
Sankrail – 73.35%
Medinipur Sadar subdivision
Garhbeta I – 72.21%
Garhbeta II – 75.87%
Garhbeta III – 73.42%
Keshpur – 77.88%
Midnapore Sadar – 70.48%
Salboni – 74.87%
Ghatal subdivision
Chandrakona I – 78.93%
Chandrakona II – 75.96%
Daspur I – 83.99%
Daspur II – 85.62%
Ghatal – 81.08%
Kharagpur subdivision
Dantan I – 73.53%
Dantan II – 82.45%
Debra – 82.03%
Keshiari – 76.78%
Kharagpur I – 77.06%
Kharagpur II – 76.08%
Mohanpur – 80.51%
Narayangarh – 78.31%
Pingla – 83.57%
Sabang – 86.84%
2011 Census: CD Block Wise

Primary Census Abstract Data

=== Language and religion ===
Religion in Gopiballavpur I CD block (2011)
Hinduism	97.85%
Other (tribal religion)	0.86%
Islam	0.70%
Other or not stated	0.59%

In the 2011 census Hindus numbered 105,926 and formed 97.85% of the population in Gopiballavpur I CD block. Muslims numbered 761 and formed 0.70% of the population. Others numbered 1,567 and formed 1.45% of the population. Others include Addi Bassi, Marang Boro, Santal, Saranath, Sari Dharma, Sarna, Alchchi, Bidin, Sant, Saevdharm, Seran, Saran, Sarin, Kheria, Christian and other religious communities. In 2001, Hindus were 89.82%, Muslims 0.74% and tribal religions 8.69% of the population respectively.

Languages of Gopiballavpur I CD block (2011)
1. Bengali (76.1%)
2. Santali (19.9%)
3. Mundari (2.96%)
4. Others (1.04%)

At the time of the 2011 census, 76.06% of the population spoke Bengali, 19.94% Santali and 2.96% Mundari as their first language.

== BPL families ==
In Gopiballavpur I CD block 44.21% families were living below poverty line in 2007.

According to the District Human Development Report of Paschim Medinipur: The 29 CD blocks of the district were classified into four categories based on the poverty ratio. Nayagram, Binpur II and Jamboni CD blocks have very high poverty levels (above 60%). Kharagpur I, Kharagpur II, Sankrail, Garhbeta II, Pingla and Mohanpur CD blocks have high levels of poverty (50-60%), Jhargram, Midnapore Sadar, Dantan I, Gopiballavpur II, Binpur I, Dantan II, Keshiari, Chandrakona I, Gopiballavpur I, Chandrakona II, Narayangarh, Keshpur, Ghatal, Sabang, Garhbeta I, Salboni, Debra and Garhbeta III CD blocks have moderate levels of poverty (25-50%) and Daspur II and Daspur I have low levels of poverty (below 25%).

== Economy ==
=== Infrastructure ===
192 or 98% of mouzas in Gopiballavpur I CD block were electrified by 31 March 2014.

215 mouzas in Gopiballavpur I CD block had drinking water facilities in 2013-14. There were 51 fertiliser depots, 10 seed stores and 30 fair price shops in the CD Block.

=== Agriculture ===
Persons engaged in agriculture
in Gopiballavpur I CD block
1. Bargadars (3.14%)
2. Patta holders (36.4%)
3. Small farmers (1.71%)
4. Marginal farmers (20.8%)
5. Agricultural labourers (37.7%)

Although the Bargadari Act of 1950 recognised the rights of bargadars to a higher share of crops from the land that they tilled, it was not implemented fully. Large tracts, beyond the prescribed limit of land ceiling, remained with the rich landlords. From 1977 onwards major land reforms took place in West Bengal. Land in excess of land ceiling was acquired and distributed amongst the peasants. Following land reforms land ownership pattern has undergone transformation. In 2013-14, persons engaged in agriculture in Gopiballavpur I CD block could be classified as follows: bargadars 3.14%, patta (document) holders 36.63%, small farmers (possessing land between 1 and 2 hectares) 1.71%, marginal farmers (possessing land up to 1 hectare) 20.84% and agricultural labourers 37.68%.

In 2005-06 net cropped area in Gopiballavpur I CD block was 15,265 hectares and the area in which more than one crop was grown was 10,547 hectares.

The extension of irrigation has played a role in growth of the predominantly agricultural economy. In 2013-14, the total area irrigated in Gopiballavpur I CD block was 4,395 hectares, out of which 1,123 hectares were by canal waters, 48 hectares by tank water, 30 hectares by deep tubewells, 2,530 hectares by shallow tube wells, 50 hectares by river lift irrigation, 203 hectares by open dug wells and 411 hectares by other methods.

In 2013-14, Gopiballavpur I CD block produced 1,965 tonnes of Aman paddy, the main winter crop, from 1,937 hectares, 1,092 tonnes of Aus paddy (summer crop) from 642 hectares, 2,672 tonnes of Boro paddy (spring crop) from 874 hectares, 329 tonnes of wheat from 143 hectares and 126,782 tonnes of potatoes from 3,308 hectares. It also produced pulses and oilseeds.

=== Banking ===
In 2013-14, Gopiballavpur I CD block had offices of 7 commercial banks and 1 gramin bank.

== Transport ==
Gaopiballavpur I CD block has 3 ferry services and 8 originating/ terminating bus routes. The nearest railway station is 45 km from the CD block headquarters.

State Highway 9 running from Durgapur (in Paschim Bardhaman district) to Nayagram (in Jhargram district) passes through this CD block.

== Education ==
In 2013-14, Gopiballavpur I CD block had 131 primary schools with 6,952 students, 29 middle schools with 805 students and 12 higher secondary schools with 12,925 students. Gopiballavpur I CD block had 1 general college with 1,240 students, 1 technical/ professional institution with 100 students and 289 institutions for special and non-formal education with 8,126 students.

The United Nations Development Programme considers the combined primary and secondary enrolment ratio as the simple indicator of educational achievement of the children in the school going age. The infrastructure available is important. In Gopiballavpur I CD block out of the total 131 primary schools in 2008-2009, 106 had pucca buildings, 3 partially pucca and 22 multiple type.

Nayagram and Gopiballavpur I CD blocks have been identified as educationally backward blocks and special efforts are being made through National Programme of Education for Girls at Elementary Level and Kasturba Gandhi Balika Vidyalaya hostels. These are the hostels for accommodating girl students from weaker sections of the society and all costs relating to their livelihood are borne by the government so that they are not to be deprived of availing elementary education for want of money or other social issues.

Subarnarekha Mahavidyalaya was established at Gopiballavpur in 1988 and is affiliated to Vidyasagar University. It offers honours in English, Bengali, Sanskrit, Santali, history, geography, anthropology and accountancy

== Healthcare ==
In 2017, Gopiballavpur I CD block had 1 rural hospital & 1 super speciality hospital and 3 primary health centres with total 150 beds and 35 doctors. It had 21 family welfare sub centres an. 12,264 patients were treated indoor and 122,000 patients were treated outdoor in the hospitals, health centres and subcentres of the CD block.

In 2014, Gopiballavpur I CD block had 1 rural hospital and 3 primary health centres with total 50 beds and 5 doctors. It had 21 family welfare sub centres and 1 family welfare centre. 5,264 patients were treated indoor and 87,323 patients were treated outdoor in the hospitals, health centres and subcentres of the CD Block.

Gopiballavpur Rural Hospital, with 30 beds at Gopiballavpur, is a major government medical facility in the Gopiballavpur I CD block. There are primary health centres at: Sasra (with 10 beds), Alampur (with 6 beds) and Dhansole (with 4 beds).

As of 2017, the super-specialty hospital has started functioning in Gopiballavpur.
