= Amiya Kisku =

Indian politician

Minister of State, Government of West Bengal
- Incumbent
- Assumed office 1 June 2026
- Governor: R. N. Ravi
- Chief Minister: Suvendu Adhikari
- Departments: Food Processing Industries and Horticulture; Agriculture

Member of the West Bengal Legislative Assembly
- Incumbent
- Assumed office 4 May 2026
- Preceded by: Dulal Murmu
- Constituency: Nayagram

Personal details
- Party: Bharatiya Janata Party
- Profession: Politician

Amiya Kisku is an Indian politician and member of the Bharatiya Janata Party. He was elected as a Member of the West Bengal Legislative Assembly from the Nayagram (ST) constituency in the 2026 West Bengal Legislative Assembly election.He is currently serving as the Minister of State for Food Processing Industries and Horticulture & Agriculture of West Bengal.
