= Jangalkanya Setu =

Bridge in West Bengal's Jhargram district

bhasaraghat Bridge
- Coordinates: 22°03′14″N 87°11′02″E
- Carries: Two paths, one way traffic for all the traffic on every way
- Crosses: Subarnarekha River
- Locale: Nayagram, Jhargram district, West Bengal, India
- Official name: Jangalkanya Setu
- Other name(s): Nayagram-bhasaraghat bridge
- Named for: Jangalmahal

Characteristics
- Design: The bridge was designed by Design wing of P.W.D
- Total length: 1.472 kilometres (0.915 mi)
- Width: 12 metres (39 ft)

History
- Construction end: 2016
- Construction cost: ₹ 170 crore
- Opened: 11 February 2016
- Closed: No

Statistics
- Daily traffic: Road traffic
- Toll: No

Jangalkanya Setu or Bhasaraghat Bridge is a bridge located in Nayagram in Jhargram district, West Bengal.This bridge was launched in 2016. The bridge is about 1.47 km (0.915 mi) long built on Subarnarekha river. It is the fourth longest bridge in West Bengal. On this day, about 95 kilometers of road to reach Kharagpur via Gobibalppur from Nayagram.To reach Kharagpur via the Nayagram-Keshiariyi, it is only 45 km to reach the 1.47 km long junctional bridge.The bridge was under the control of Midnapore Highway Sub-Division 2 P.W(ROADS)DTE.

== Construction ==
Subarnarekha River was blocked by Nayagram and Keshri. The river blocked the communication of this area. In 2011, Chief Minister Mamata Banerjee announced the construction of the bridge of Vasraghat. But there were already temporary bridges which were constructed every year and during the rainy season, the concrete bridge would be broken. The construction of the bridge was completed in 2016. Bridge was inaugurated by Chief Minister Mamata Banerjee on 11 February 2016.

== Accident ==
A passenger bus hit in bridge's railing after the 15 days of inauguration of the bridge on 26 February (2016) . The private bus was going from Midnapore to Nayagram with fifty passengers. The bus was moving very fast. The bus was hit by the pillar when the bus got out of the Jangalkanya bridge.
