= Gopiballavpur =

- Town
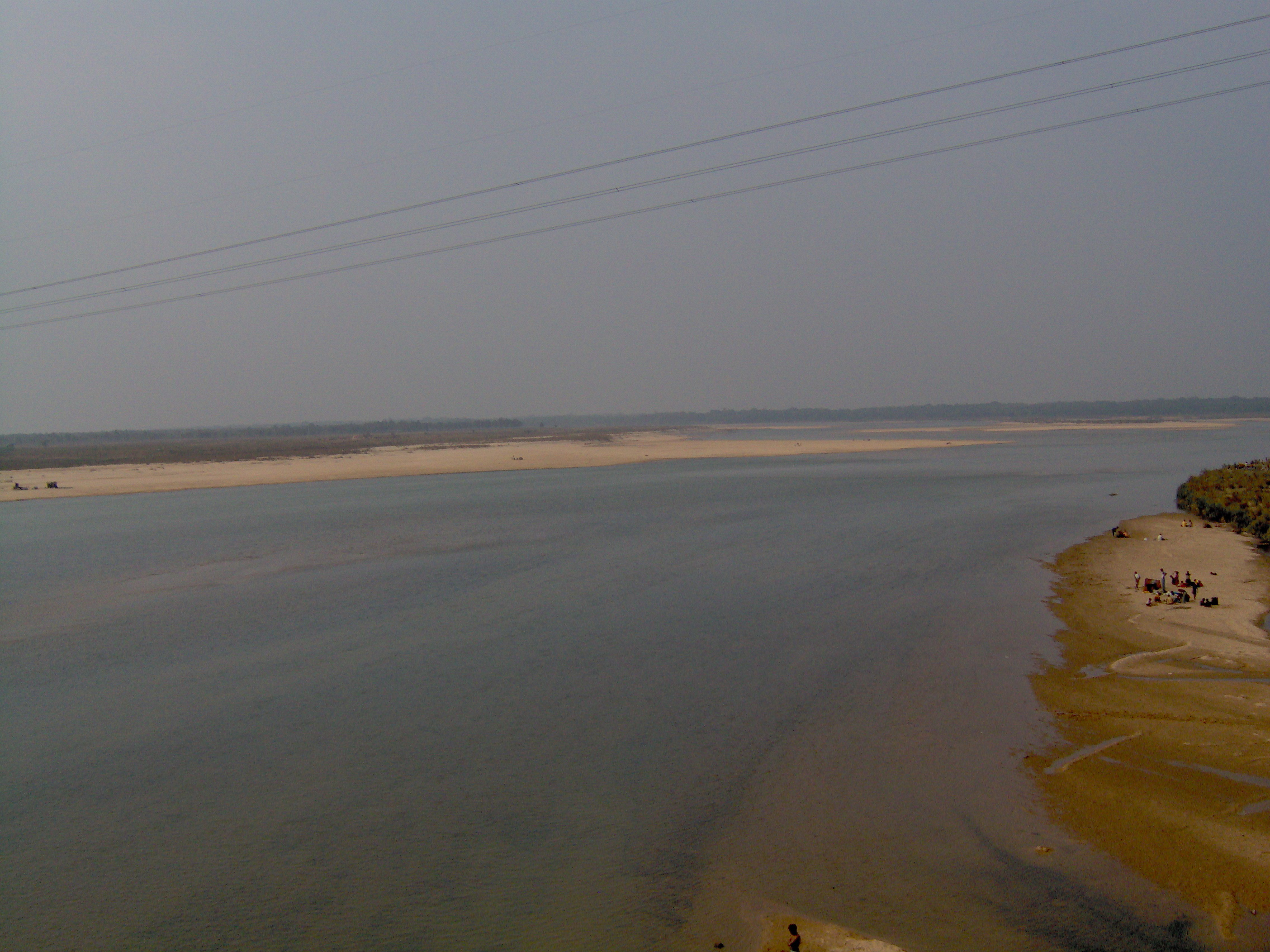
- Subarnarekha at Gopiballavpur

- Location in West Bengal, India
- Coordinates: 22.22°N 86.9°E
- Country: India
- State: West Bengal
- District: Jhargram
- Elevation: 114 m (374 ft)

Population (2011)
  - Total: 12,380

Languages
  - Official: Bengali, Santali, and English
- Time zone: UTC+5:30 (IST)
- PIN: 721506
- Telephone code: (+91)3221
- ISO 3166 code: IN-WB
- Lok Sabha constituency: Jhargram
- Vidhan Sabha constituency: Nayagram
- Website: jhargram.gov.in www.jhargramsadarsubdivision.org

Gopiballavpur (Bengali pronunciation: [ɡopibɔlːobʱpuɾ]) is a town and a gram panchayat in the Gopiballavpur I CD block in the Jhargram subdivision of the Jhargram district of West Bengal, India.

== History ==
Earlier this area was a part of Mayurbhanj princely state. The place was earlier known as Kashipur. Shyamananda Mahaprabhu, a prominent figure in the Vaishnava sect, was being commanded by Shrimati Radha Rani to travel and carry the holy waters of Yamuna to this place and establish a temple since then the village is named after Gopiballav (Sri Krishna). Kashipur came to be known as Gopiballavpur since then. The village houses this old temple since 1400 and its being run and administered by Vaishnava Goswami families since then. Currently the Mahant is the head of the temple.

The temple is known as Shri Radha Govinda Mandir and known to the vaishnavas as "Gupta Vrindavan". It houses the idols of Shri Radha Govind Ji and Smt. Radha Rani along with idols of Jagannatha Mahaprabhu, Balabhadra and Subadhra. An annual Car Festival (Ratha Yatra) is held every year. Gopiballabpur also houses ancient Mahadev Temple where Gajan Mela is held every year. Besides Gajon, Chorok Mela, Snan Jatra, Jhulon Jatra are prominent festivals in the area. The chou dancers from Odisha are brought every year to give performances to audience in these fairs.

== Geography ==
Cities and towns in Jhargram subdivision of Jhargram district
CT: census town, R: rural/ urban centre, H: historical/ religious centre
Owing to space constraints in the small map, the actual locations in a larger map may vary slightly

=== Location ===
Gopiballavpur is located at 22.20°N 86.89°E. It has an average elevation of 34 metres (114 feet).

The town is on the banks of the Subarnarekha River near the Jharkhand and Odisha borders.

=== Area overview ===
Jhargram subdivision, the only one in Jhargram district, shown in the map alongside, is composed of hills, mounds and rolling lands. It is rather succinctly described in the District Human Development Report, 2011 (at that time it was part of Paschim Medinipur district), “The western boundary is more broken and picturesque, for the lower ranges of the Chhotanagpur Hills line the horizon, the jungle assumes the character of forest, and large trees begin to predominate. The soil, however, is lateritic, a considerable area is unproductive, almost uninhabited, especially in the extreme north-west where there are several hills over 1000 feet in height. The remainder of the country is an almost level plain broken only by the sand hills.” 3.48% of the population lives in urban areas and 96.52% lives in the rural areas. 20.11% of the total population belonged to scheduled castes and 29.37% belonged to scheduled tribes.

Note: The map alongside presents some of the notable locations in the subdivision. All places marked in the map are linked in the larger full screen map.

== Demographics ==
According to the 2011 Census of India, Gopiballavpur had a total population of 4,061 of which 2,055 (51%) were males and 2,006 (49%) were females. Population in the age range 0–6 years was 401. The total number of literate persons in Gopiballavpur was 3,111 (76.61% of the population over 6 years).

== Civic administration ==
=== Police station ===
Gopiballavpur police station has jurisdiction over Gopiballavpur I CD block.

== Transport ==
Gopiballavpur is accessible by road from Kolkata and Odisha. Regular deluxe bus service run from Esplanade to Gopiballavpur. Prominent players are the Nilmadhaba Bus Service, Joymadhavba Bus Service, Devdas Bus Service, Das and Das Bus Service and the buses of Dhumsai route. Night service buses run to and from Cuttack, Bhubaneswar and Puri.

By rail Gopiballavpur is about (48 km) from Jhargram. Take Ispat Express from Howrah station in the morning to reach Jhargram. The journey takes a little more than two hours. Also, several buses from Kharagpur railway station are available.

The newly sanctioned Chakulia-Buramara railway line will go via Gopiballavpur providing train connectivity to people.

State Highway 9 running from Durgapur (in Paschim Bardhaman district) to Nayagram (in Jhargram district) passes through Gopiballavpur.

National Highway 116C running from Contai(Kanthi) (in Purba Medinipur district) to Hatibari (in Jhargram district) & further upto Jamsola (in Odisha) connecting National Highway 49. This highway connect Gopiballavpur with Kharagpur via Keshiyari & Narayangarh.

== Education ==
=== General degree colleges ===
- Subarnarekha Mahavidyalaya

== Healthcare ==
Gopiballavpur Rural Hospital, with 30 beds at Gopiballavpur, is a major government medical facility in the Gopiballavpur I CD Welfare Department | work= Health Statistiblock.

As of 2017, the super-specialty hospital has started functioning in Gopiballavpur.
