= Churamani Mahato =

Indian politician

MLA of Gopiballavpur Vidhan Sabha Constituency
- In office 2011–2021
- Preceded by: Rabi Lal Maitra

Personal details
- Party: All India Trinamool Congress

Churamani Mahato is an Indian politician in the All India Trinamool Congress party. He was elected as MLA of Gopiballavpur Vidhan Sabha constituency in West Bengal Legislative Assembly in 2011 and 2016.
