= Nayagram =

- Village
- Location in West Bengal, India Nayagram (India)
- Coordinates: 22°01′54.8″N 87°10′41.2″E
- Country: India
- State: West Bengal
- District: Jhargram
- Subdivision: Jhargram

Government
  - Body: Gram panchayat

Languages
  - Official: Bengali, Santali, English
- Time zone: UTC+5:30 (IST)
- ISO 3166 code: IN-WB
- Website: jhargram.gov.in

Nayagram is a village and a gram panchayat in the Nayagram CD block in the Jhargram subdivision of the Jhargram district in West Bengal, India.

== Geography ==
Cities and towns in Jhargram subdivision of Jhargram district
CT: census town, R: rural/ urban centre, H: historical/ religious centre
Owing to space constraints in the small map, the actual locations in a larger map may vary slightly

=== Location ===
Nayagram is located at 22°01′54.8″N 87°10′41.2″E

=== Area overview ===
Jhargram subdivision, the only one in Jhargram district, shown in the map alongside, is composed of hills, mounds and rolling lands. It is rather succinctly described in the District Human Development Report, 2011 (at that time it was part of Paschim Medinipur district), “The western boundary is more broken and picturesque, for the lower ranges of the Chhotanagpur Hills line the horizon, the jungle assumes the character of forest, and large trees begin to predominate. The soil, however, is lateritic, a considerable area is unproductive, almost uninhabited, especially in the extreme north-west where there are several hills over 1000 feet in height. The remainder of the country is an almost level plain broken only by the sand hills.” 3.48% of the population lives in urban areas and 96.52% lives in the rural areas. 20.11% of the total population belonged to scheduled castes and 29.37% belonged to scheduled tribes.

Note: The map alongside presents some of the notable locations in the subdivision. All places marked in the map are linked in the larger full screen map.

== Demographics ==
According to the 2011 Census of India, Nayagram had a total population of 483 of which 225 (47%) were males and 258 (53%) were females. Population in the age range 0–6 years was 65. The total number of literate persons in Nayagram was 251 (60% of the population over 6 years).

== Civic administration ==
=== Police station ===
Nayagram police station has jurisdiction over the Nayagram CD block.

== Transport ==
State Highway 9 originating from Durgapur (in Paschim Bardhaman district) terminates at Nayagram.

Jangalkanya Setu or Bavsaraghat Bridge linking Keshiary CD block and Nayagram CD block, across the Subarnarekha River, was inaugurated by Mamata Banerjee, Chief Minister in 2016.

== Healthcare ==
The 300-bedded Sperspecialty Hospital at Nayagram was inaugurated in 2015.
