= Nayagram Assembly constituency =

Nayagram
- Constituency No. 220 for the West Bengal Legislative Assembly
- Interactive Map Outlining Nayagram Assembly Constituency

Constituency details
- Country: India
- Region: East India
- State: West Bengal
- District: Jhargram
- Lok Sabha constituency: Jhargram
- Established: 1962
- Total electors: 174,987
- Reservation: ST

Member of Legislative Assembly
- 18th West Bengal Legislative Assembly
- Incumbent Amiya Kisku
- Party: BJP
- Alliance: NDA
- Elected year: 2026

Nayagram is an assembly constituency in Jhargram district in the Indian state of West Bengal. It is reserved for scheduled tribes.

== Overview ==
As per orders of the Delimitation Commission, No. 220 Nayagram Assembly constituency (ST) is composed of the following: Nayagram and Gopiballavpur I community development blocks, and Chorchita, Kuliana and Nota gram panchayats of Gopiballavpur II CD Block.

Nayagram Assembly constituency (ST) is part of No. 33 Jhargram (Lok Sabha constituency) (ST).

== Members of the Legislative Assembly ==
Year	Name	Party
1962	Debendranath Hansda	Independent politician
1967	Jagarati Hansda	Bangla Congress
1969	Jagarati Hansda	Bangla Congress
1971	Dasarathi Saren	Indian National Congress
1972	Dasarathi Saren	Indian National Congress
1977	Budhadeb Singh	Communist Party of India (Marxist)
1982	Ananta Saren	Communist Party of India (Marxist)
1987	Ananta Saren	Communist Party of India (Marxist)
1991	Ananta Saren	Communist Party of India (Marxist)
1996	Subhas Chandra Saren	Communist Party of India (Marxist)
2001	Bhutnath Saren	Communist Party of India (Marxist)
2006	Bhutnath Saren	Communist Party of India (Marxist)
2011	Dulal Murmu	All India Trinamool Congress
2016	Dulal Murmu	All India Trinamool Congress
2021	Dulal Murmu	All India Trinamool Congress
2026	Amiya Kisku	Bharatiya Janata Party

== Election results ==
=== 2026 ===
2026 West Bengal Legislative Assembly election: Nayagram
Party	Candidate	Votes	%	±%
BJP	Amiya Kisku	100,857	48.56	+7.93
AITC	Dulal Murmu	94,433	45.46	−7.0
CPI(M)	Dr. Pulin Bihari Baske	5,338	2.57	−0.48
NOTA	None of the above	2,890	1.39	−0.21
Majority		6,424	3.1	−8.73
Turnout		207,713	91.47	+6.65
BJP gain from AITC		Swing		

=== 2021 ===
2021 West Bengal Legislative Assembly election: Nayagram
Party	Candidate	Votes	%	±%
AITC	Dulal Murmu	100,903	52.46	
BJP	Bakul Murmu	78,149	40.63	
CPI(M)	Haripada Saren	5,863	3.05	
BSP	Shyam Mandi	1,858	0.97	
NOTA	None of the above	3,086	1.6	
Majority		22,754	11.83	
Turnout		192,354	84.82	
AITC hold		Swing		

=== 2016 ===
2016 West Bengal Legislative Assembly election: Nayagram (ST)
Party	Candidate	Votes	%	±%
AITC	Dulal Murmu	98,395	58.00	+7.60
BJP	Bakul Murmu	55,140	33.50	+28.00
INC	Manoj Kumar Tudu	14,094		
SUCI(C)	Naran Hembram	1,451		
None of the Above	None of the above	3,456		
Independent	Ramesh Chandra Sing	1,302		
Independent	Rupai Hembram	1,173		
Majority				
Turnout				
AITC hold		Swing		

=== 2011 ===
West Bengal assembly elections, 2011: Nayagram
Party	Candidate	Votes	%	±%
AITC	Dulal Murmu	75,656	50.34	+30.72
CPI(M)	Bhutnath Soren	59,382	39.51	−21.32
BJP	Chitta Ranjan Hembram	8,304		
Independent	Subodh Kumar Mandi	4,054		
JDP	Madan Mohan Hansda	2,894		
Turnout		150,290	85.89	
AITC gain from CPI(M)		Swing	52.04	

=== 2006 ===
In 2006 and 2001 state assembly elections Bhutnath Saren of CPI(M) won the Nayagram assembly seat defeating Shunaram Mahali of Trinamool Congress in 2006 and Mangal Hansda of JMM in 2001. Contests in most years were multi cornered but only winners and runners are being mentioned. Subhas Chandra Saren of CPI(M) defeated Madhu Sudan Saren of Congress in 1996. Ananta Saren of CPI(M) defeated Bishnu Saren of Jharkhand Party in 1991, Dasarathi Saren of Congress in 1987, and Liba Chand Tudu, Independent, in 1982. Budhadeb Singh of CPI(M) defeated Subodh Handa of Janata Party in 1977.

=== 1972 ===
Dasarathi Saren of Congress won in 1972 and 1971. Jagarati Hansda of Bangla Congress won in 1969 and 1967. Debendranath Hansda won the Nayagram seat in 1962. Prior to that the Nayagram seat was not there.
