= Gopiballavpur Assembly constituency =

Gopiballavpur
- Constituency No. 221 for the West Bengal Legislative Assembly
- Interactive Map Outlining Gopiballavpur Assembly Constituency

Constituency details
- Country: India
- Region: East India
- State: West Bengal
- District: Jhargram
- Lok Sabha constituency: Jhargram
- Established: 1951
- Total electors: 2,26,417
- Reservation: None

Member of Legislative Assembly
- 18th West Bengal Legislative Assembly
- Incumbent Rajesh Mahata
- Party: BJP
- Alliance: NDA
- Elected year: 2026

Gopiballavpur Assembly constituency is an assembly constituency in Jhargram district in the Indian state of West Bengal.

== Overview ==
As per orders of the Delimitation Commission, No. 221 Gopiballavpur Assembly constituency is composed of the following: Beliabera, Kharbandhi, Pet Bindhi and Tapshia gram panchayats of Gopiballavpur II community development block and Aguiboni, Chandri, Chubka, Dudhkundi, Lodhasuli, Nedabahara, Patashimul, Shalboni and Sardiha gram panchayats of Jhargram CD Block and Sankrail CD Block.

Gopiballavpur Assembly constituency is part of No. 33 Jhargram (Lok Sabha constituency) (ST).

== Members of the Legislative Assembly ==
Year	Name	Party
1951	Dhananjoy Kar	Kisan Mazdoor Praja Party
1951	Jagatpati Hansda	Kisan Mazdoor Praja Party
1957	Dhananjoy Kar	Indian National Congress
1957	Jagatpati Hansda	Indian National Congress
1962	Surendra Nath Mahata	Indian National Congress
1967	Dhananjoy Kar	Samyukta Socialist Party
1969	Dhananjoy Kar	Samyukta Socialist Party
1971	Harish Mahapatra	Indian National Congress
1972	Harish Mahapatra	Indian National Congress
1977	Santosh Rana	Independent politician
1982	Santosh Rana	Independent politician
1987	Sunil De	Communist Party of India
1991	Atul Chandra Das	Communist Party of India
1996	Rana Shakti	Communist Party of India
2001	Bhabani Shankar Hatial	Communist Party of India
2006	Rabi Lal Maitra	Communist Party of India
2011	Churamani Mahata	Trinamool Congress
2016	Churamani Mahata	Trinamool Congress
2021	Khagendra Nath Mahata	Trinamool Congress
2026	Rajesh Mahata	Bharatiya Janata Party

== Election results ==
=== 2026 ===
2026 West Bengal Legislative Assembly election: Gopiballavpur
Party	Candidate	Votes	%	±%
BJP	Rajesh Mahata	114,683	53.75	▲13.39
AITC	Ajit Mahata	88,008	41.24	▼11.06
CPI	Bikash Sharanghi	3,149	1.48	
NOTA	None of the above	2,532	1.19	▼0.21
Majority		26,675	12.51	▲0.57
Turnout		213,383	93.56	▲5.64
BJP hold		Swing		

=== 2021 ===
2021 West Bengal Legislative Assembly election: Gopiballavpur
Party	Candidate	Votes	%	±%
AITC	Khagendra Nath Mahata	104,115	52.3	
BJP	Sanjit Mahato	80,347	40.36	
CPI(M)	Prasanta Das	5,819	2.92	
NOTA	None of the above	2,791	1.4	
Majority		23,768	11.94	
Turnout		199,070	87.92	
AITC hold		Swing		

=== 2016 ===
2016 West Bengal Legislative Assembly election: Gopiballavpur
Party	Candidate	Votes	%	±%
AITC	Churamani Mahata	100,323	56.00	−0.70
CPI(M)	Pulin Bihari Baske	50,765	28.00	−8.55
BJP	Sushil Kumar Ghosh	21,338	12.00	+8.20
None of the Above	None of the above	3,622	1.20	
Turnout				
AITC hold		Swing		

=== 2011 ===
West Bengal assembly elections, 2011: Gopiballavpur
Party	Candidate	Votes	%	±%
AITC	Churamani Mahato	90,070	56.70	+24.47
CPI(M)	Rabi Lal Maitra	58,050	36.55	−26.80
BJP	Sanjit Mahata	5,935	3.80	
Independent	Upangshu Mahato	4,789		
Turnout		158,844	89.4	
AITC gain from CPI(M)		Swing	51.27#	

# Swing calculated on Congress
+Trinamool Congress vote percentages taken together in 2006.

=== 2006 ===
In the 2006 state assembly elections, Rabi Lal Maitra of CPI(M) won the Gopiballavpur assembly seat defeating his nearest rival Swapan Patra of Trinamool Congress. Contests in most years were multi cornered but only winners and runners are being mentioned. Bhabani Shankar Hatial of CPI(M) defeated Samay Mandi of Trinamool Congress in 2001. Rana Shakti of CPI(M) defeated Rekha Rani Mahata of Congress in 1996. Atul Chandra Das of CPI(M) defeated Prasun Sarangi of Congress in 1991. Sunil De of CPI(M) defeated Bijoy Kumar Sahu of Congress in 1987 and Santosh Rana, Independent, in 1982. Santosh Rana, Independent, defeated Abani Bhusan Satpathi of CPI(M) in 1977.

=== 1972 ===
Harish Mahapatra of Congress won in 1972 and 1971. Dhananjoy Kar of SSP won in 1969 and 1967. Surendra Nath Mahata of Congress won in 1962. In 1957 and 1951 Gopiballavpur had dual seats. Surendra Nath Mahata and Jagatpati Hansda, both of Congress, won in 1957. Dhanajoy Kar and Jagatpati Hansda, both of KMPP, won in independent India's first election in 1951.
