= Vidyasagar University =

Indian public university in West Bengal

- Motto: ṣikśa, gyan, pragati
- Motto in English: Education, knowledge, progress
- Recognition: AICTE; BCI
- Type: Public research university
- Established: 29 September 1981; 44 years ago
- Founder: Anil Kumar Gain
- Accreditation: NAAC
- Academic affiliations: UGC; AIU
- Endowment: ₹94.16 crore (US$9.8 million) (2024–25 est.)
- Chancellor: Governor of West Bengal
- Vice-Chancellor: Dipak Kumar Kar
- Academic staff: 311 (2025)
- Students: 4,558 (2025)
- Postgraduates: 3,616 (2025)
- Doctoral students: 942 (2025)
- Location: Midnapore, West Bengal, India; 23°25′55″N 87°17′52″E
- Campus: Urban 138.78 acres (56.16 ha)
- Website: www.vidyasagar.ac.in

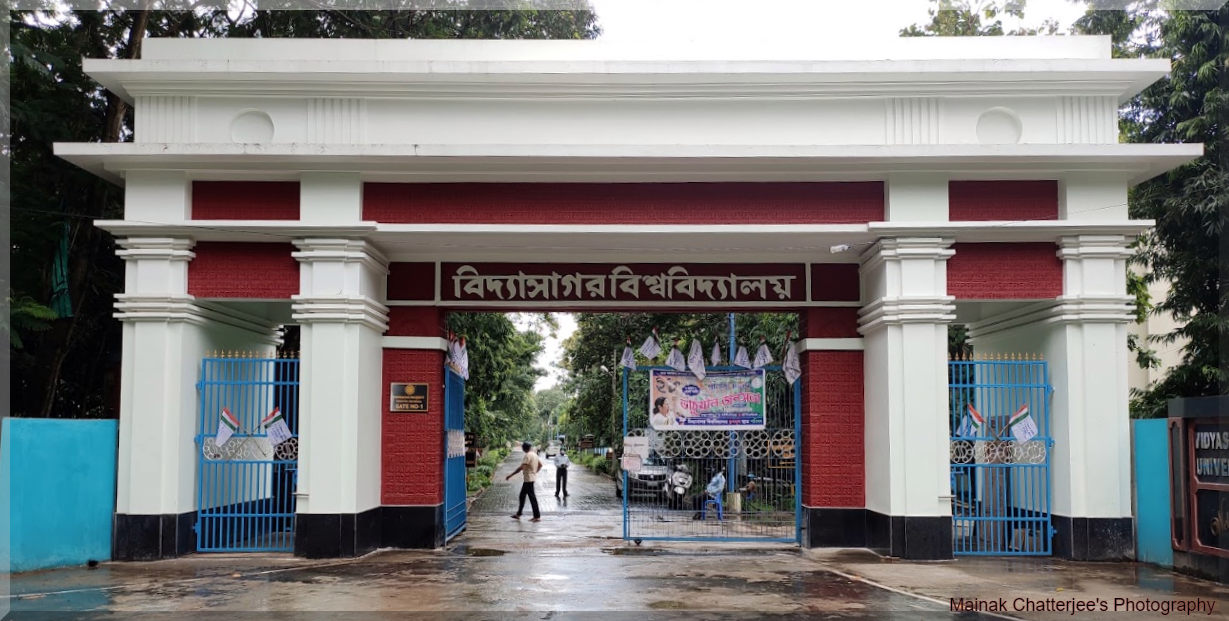
The main entrance of Vidyasagar University

Vidyasagar University is a public state research university that was established by an Act of the West Bengal legislature which was notified in the Calcutta Gazette on 24 June 1981. It is an affiliating university in Paschim Medinipur district of southern West Bengal, India. It offers courses at the undergraduate and post-graduate levels. It has its jurisdiction over Midnapore.

It was founded by the University of Cambridge mathematician and statistician Anil Kumar Gain.

== History ==
The university was established on 29 September 1981 by the Vidyasagar University Act 1981 (West Bengal Act XVIII of 1981) of the state of West Bengal to commemorate Pandit Iswar Chandra Bandyopadhyay, also known as Ishwar Chandra Vidyasagar, an educationist and social worker of 19th century Bengal. The University Grants Commission accorded recognition to the university under Section 12 B on 1 March 1990.

A short history of Vidyasagar University is written by a faculty of the Anthropology Department in Bengali which was published in January 2001 from Kolkata. In this book the author being one of the founder teachers of the university narrated the missions of the institution as well as the deviations and the future possibilities in the context of globalisation.

=== Establishment ===
Following the approval of UGC, the Government of West Bengal decided in 1978 to establish Vidyasagar University and, in consultation with the U.G.C., the State Government appointed a Planning Committee in March 1979 to lay down the lines of development and to take initial steps to found the university. The committee submitted its report in October. Then the Vidyasagar University Act, 1981 (West Bengal Act XVIII of 1981) was passed in the State Legislative Assembly. Professor Bhupesh Chandra Mukherjee, a former teacher of History of the then Presidency College, Kolkata, joined as the first vice chancellor on 29 September 1981. Professor B.C. Mukherjee wrote an article in the Journal of Higher Education(published by the UGC) in which he stated the mission and objectives of Vidyasagar University and mentioned the name of the founder of VU—Professor Anil Kumar Gain.

Academic activities started when through a notification [no. 983-Edn (U), dated Calcutta 23 May] issued by the State Government, 30 colleges of the District of Midnapore were affiliated to the Vidyasagar University with effect from 1 June 1985. The foundation stone of the main campus (at Tantigaria mouza of Midnapore Sadar Town for post graduate teaching and central administration) was laid on 18 July 1983 by the university's chancellor and West Bengal governor B.D. Pande. On 15 January 1986, it was inaugurated by Jyoti Basu, the then chief minister of West Bengal.

On 16 January classes commenced in six post graduate departments: Anthropology, Applied Mathematics with Oceanology and Computer Programming, Commerce with Farm Management, Economics with Rural Development, Library and Information Science, Political Science with Rural Administration.

The U.G.C. accorded recognition to the university in terms of Section 12B of the U.G.C. Act, on 1 March 1990. The university houses 27 PG departments (apart from MBA which is run under the Department of Commerce with Farm Management), 12 in Humanities and 15 in Science while 46 undergraduate colleges apart from 11 courses in yet 11 other colleges / institutes are affiliated to it. Fourteen vocational subjects and six other specialised courses are offered at the UG level. The overall emphasis of the university is not to perpetuate the traditional nature of the other universities of West Bengal but to merge as a distinctive entity with a special nature of its own. The National Assessment and Accreditation Council (NAAC) awarded Vidyasagar University a three-star status.

== Campus ==
The total area of university campuses in the semi-rural areas is 182.75 acres (0.7396 km^{2}). It may be distributed as:

- Main Campus: 103.79 acres (0.4200 km^{2})
- Residential Campus: 35.00 acres (141,600 m^{2})
- Third plot: 43.97 acres (177,900 m^{2}) The third plotwhich was given by the district administration was taken back since the university could not use it for its purpose.

== Organisation and administration ==
=== Governance ===
The Vice-chancellor of Vidyasagar University is the chief executive officer of the university. Prof. Dipak Kumar Kar is the present Vice-chancellor of the university.

List of All Vice-Chancellors
No.	Name
1.	Prof. Bhupesh Chandra Mukherjee
2.	Prof. Birendra Nath Goswami
3.	Prof. Jyotirmoy Pal Chaudhuri
4.	Prof. Manas Kumar Chattopadhyay
5.	Prof. Manoranjan Maiti
6.	Prof. Satya Narayan Ghosh
7.	Prof. Amiya Kumar Dev
8.	Prof. Ananda Deb Mukhopadhyay
9.	Prof. Swapan Kumar Pramanick
10.	Prof. Nanda Dulal Paria
11.	Prof. Ranjan Chakrabarti
12.	Prof. Sibaji Pratim Basu
13.	Prof. Pabitra Kumar Chakrabarti
14.	Prof. Susanta Kumar Chakraborty
15.	Prof. Dipak Kumar Kar (Incumbent)

=== Affiliations ===
The university is an affiliating institution and has its jurisdiction over Purba Medinipur, Paschim Medinipur, and Jhargram districts or any district which may be created in future out of any parts thereof. Thirty colleges of the University of Calcutta in the erstwhile district of Midnapore were initially deemed to be affiliated to Vidyasagar University. Presently, the university affiliates dozens of colleges and institutes across the region:

Colleges and institutes affiliated to Vidyasagar University
District	Affiliated institutions
Paschim Medinipur	AMIK Institute of Management Science & Technology; Belda College; Bengal Institute of Business Studies College; Bhatter College; Chaipat S.P.B. Mahavidyalaya; Chaipat Shahid Pradyot Bhattacharyya Mahavidyalaya; Chandrakona Vidyasagar Mahavidyalaya; Debra Thana Sahid Kshudiram Smriti Mahavidyalaya; Garhbeta College; Ghatal Rabindra Shatabarshiki Mahavidyalaya; Gourav Guin Memorial College; Government General Degree College, Dantan II; Government General Degree College, Kharagpur-II; Government General Degree College, Mohanpur; Government General Degree College, Narayangarh; Hijli College; K.D. College of Commerce and General Studies; Keshiary Government College; Kharagpur College; Midnapore City College; Midnapore College; Moyna College; Narajole Raj College; Oriental Institute of Science and Technology, Midnapore; Pingla Thana Mahavidyalaya; Raja Narendra Lal Khan Women's College; Sabang Sajanikanta Mahavidyalaya; Salboni Government College; Santal Bidroha Sardha Satabarsiki Mahavidyalaya; Sukumar Sengupta Mahavidyalaya; Vidyasagar Institute of Health; Vidyasagar School of Social Work
Purba Medinipur	Bajkul Milani Mahavidyalaya; Deshapran Mahavidyalaya; Egra Sarada Shashi Bhusan College; Haldia Government College; Haldia Law College; Khejuri College; Maharaja Nandakumar Mahavidyalaya; Mahishadal Girls' College; Mahishadal Raj College; Mugberia Gangadhar Mahavidyalaya; Panskura Banamali College; Prabhat Kumar College; Rabindra Bharati Mahavidyalaya; Ramnagar College; Shahid Matangini Hazra Government College for Women; Siddhinath Mahavidyalaya; Sitananda College; Swarnamoyee Jogendranath Mahavidyalaya; Tamralipta Mahavidyalaya; Vivekananda Mission Mahavidyalaya; Vivekananda Satavarshiki Mahavidyalaya; Yogoda Satsanga Palpara Mahavidyalaya
Jhargram	Government General Degree College, Gopiballavpur-II; Lalgarh Government College; Nayagram Pandit Raghunath Murmu Government College; Rani Indira Debi Government Girls College; Sankrail Anil Biswas Smriti Mahavidyalaya; Seva Bharati Mahavidyalaya; Silda Chandra Sekhar College; Subarnarekha Mahavidyalaya
Other	Durgapur Institute of Paramedical Science; Haldia Institute of Health Science; IQ City United World School of Business, Kolkata; Medinipur Law College; MIES R.M. Law College

=== Vidyasagar University Teachers' Association (VUTA) ===
The professors of Vidyasagar University formed their association in 1986 with nine teachers of the six postgraduate departments. Gradually the organization developed into a viable entity. Apart from looking into the pure financial and promotional interests of the teachers, the association regularly organizes academic seminars and cultural programmes in which many students and other members of the university community participate. On 24 July 2013 VUTA celebrated its belated silver jubilee function and published a souvenir. The organization got its registration in 2015. On 4 December 2015, and for the first time in the history of the association, a Professor in Anthropology wrote an open letter to the President of the association pointing out the anomalies in the study leave rules for the teachers.

== Academics ==
=== Admission ===
Admission in undergraduate and postgraduate course is mainly based on the result of higher secondary (10+2) and graduation (10+2+3) level results, respectively. Each college sets up their own criteria for admission in undergraduate course, but all are mainly based on higher secondary results.

For research level programs, the aspirants have to sit for a qualifying test (RET) followed by an interview. It is mandatory that they secure at least 55% marks in their post graduate level examination.

If the aspirants qualify the all India examination like NET, GATE, SET then their admission in Ph.D is only based on interview.

=== Distance education ===
Vidyasagar University has a Directorate of Distance Education (DDE, VU) for conducting post graduate studies in distance mode. This is for people who cannot undergo post graduate studies in regular (full-time) mode. The DDE, VU is on the main campus.

It was established in 1994 and started offering correspondence courses in postgraduate subjects from the session 1994-1995. Candidates pursuing distance learning courses are provided with study materials in modules on topics prescribed in the syllabus. The Directorate of Distance Education organises the Personal Contact Programme (PCP) for interaction with leading academic experts in the subjects who give counselling and advice rather than classroom lectures. PCPs are held ordinarily during Summer Recess, Puja Recess and Winter Recess and on holidays. Courses of distance education in the university are approved by the University Grants Commission (UGC) and the Distance Education Council.

=== Computer Centre ===
Computer centre takes an important role for spreading the knowledge of computer education in rural areas of West Bengal. They offers certificate and diploma courses on computer-based subjects like Office Automation and Financial Accounting, Office Automation and Internet Technologies. They offered few post graduate diploma courses in collaboration with CMC. It maintains the campus-wide LAN (optical fiber based GBIC) with 400 nodes throughout the campus and providing Internet services.

=== Sports and games ===
Games and sports of the university are an integral part of academic achievements. Sports events like Athletics, Football, Volleyball, Kho-Kho, Swimming, Kabadi, and Cricket competitions are organised regularly as per the university's Sports Calendar. The university has shown remarkable performance in All India Inter-University tournaments and all Bengal Inter-University tournaments even with limited infrastructural facilities.

=== Accreditation ===
Vidyasagar University has been awarded B grade by the National Assessment and Accreditation Council (NAAC). In the third cycle of accreditation by NAAC, Vidyasagar University has been awarded a cumulative grade point average (CPGA) of 2.86 and was placed under B Grade.

=== Publishing ===
The faculties of Vidyasagar University and its vice-chancellors have written and edited a books on subjects mainly by availing financial grant from the UGC Unassigned grant scheme.

The academic departments have been publishing journals. There are two multidisciplinary journals: one published by the biological science departments and the other by the physical science departments.

== Notable alumni ==
There is an alumni association of Vidyasagar University, established in 2000.

- Manas Kumar Santra, chemical biologist, N-Bios laureate

== Notable faculty ==
- Anil Kumar Gain

== See also ==
- List of universities in India
- Universities and colleges in India
- Education in India
- Distance Education Council
- University Grants Commission (India)
