= Dahijuri =

- Village
- Dahijuri More

- Location in West Bengal, India Dahijuri (India)
- Coordinates: 22°30′20.5″N 86°59′32.03″E
- Country: India
- State: West Bengal
- District: Jhargram

Population (2011)
  - Total: 3,237

Languages
  - Official: Bengali, Santali English
- Time zone: UTC+5:30 (IST)
- PIN: 721504 (Dahijuri)
- Telephone/STD code: 03221
- Lok Sabha constituency: Jhargram
- Vidhan Sabha constituency: Jhargram
- Website: jhargram.gov.in

Dahijuri is a village and a gram panchayat in the Binpur I CD block in the Jhargram subdivision of the Jhargram district in the state of West Bengal, India.

== Socio-political turmoil ==
Dahijuri was a centre of violent Maoist activity during the Lalgarh movement days around 2009–2011. Now Dahijuri has become stable and free from violent and Maoist activity. Dahijuri Gram Panchayat is one of the ten Gram Panchayats of Binpur-I Block.

== Geography ==
Cities and towns in Jhargram subdivision of Jhargram district
CT: census town, R: rural/ urban centre, H: historical/ religious centre
Owing to space constraints in the small map, the actual locations in a larger map may vary slightly

=== Location ===
Dahijuri is located at 22°30′20.5″N 86°59′32.03″E

=== Area overview ===
Jhargram subdivision, the only one in Jhargram district, shown in the map alongside, is composed of hills, mounds and rolling lands. It is rather succinctly described in the District Human Development Report, 2011 (at that time it was part of Paschim Medinipur district), "The western boundary is more broken and picturesque, for the lower ranges of the Chhotanagpur Hills line the horizon, the jungle assumes the character of forest, and large trees begin to predominate. The soil, however, is lateritic, a considerable area is unproductive, almost uninhabited, especially in the extreme north-west where there are several hills over 1000 feet in height. The remainder of the country is an almost level plain broken only by the sand hills". 3.48% of the population lives in urban areas and 96.52% lives in the rural areas. 20.11% of the total population belonged to scheduled castes and 29.37% belonged to scheduled tribes.

Note: The map alongside presents some of the notable locations in the subdivision. All places marked in the map are linked in the larger full screen map.

== Demographics ==
According to the 2011 Census of India, Dahijuri had a total population of 3,237 of which 1,597 (49%) were males and 1,640 (51%) were females. Population in the age range 0–6 years was 364. The total number of literate persons in Dahijuri was 2,066 (63.82% of the population over 6 years).

== Economy ==
The State Bank of India has a branch at Dahijuri. Economy mainly depends on the cultivation here. Now S.B.I came with their first A.T.M to give a new economic push.

== Transport ==
State Highway 5 running from Rupnarayanpur (in Bardhaman district) to Junput (in Purba Medinipur district) passes through Dahijuri. Dahijuri-Kanajpal-Lalgarh, Dahijuri-Dherua, Dahijuri-Parihati Roads converge on this place.

== Education ==
Dahijuri Mahatma Vidyapith was established in 1948. It is a co-educational Bengali-medium higher secondary school.

== See also ==
- Kapgari
- Lalgarh
- Binpur
- Jhargram
