= Jhargram Raj =

Feudal estate in India (1592–1952)

Jhargram Raj ঝাড়গ্রাম রাজ
- Zamindari of British India
- 1592–1952
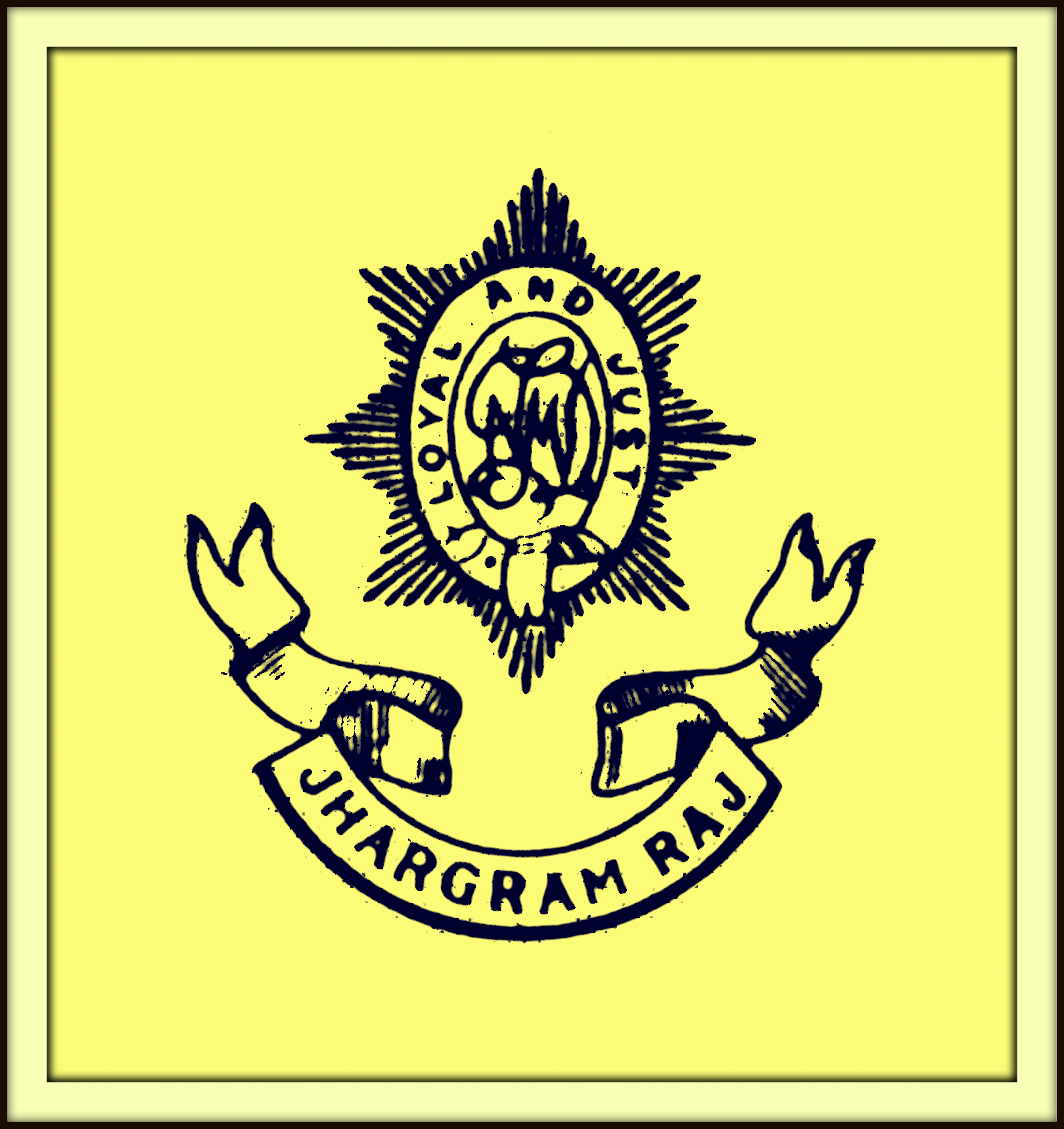
- Coat of arms
- Area
  - 1922: 655 km^{2} (253 sq mi)
- Population
  - 1922: 71,350
- History
  - Established: 1592
  - Accession to the Union of India: 1952
Preceded by	Succeeded by
Mughal Empire	Republic of India
- Today part of: Jhargram, West Bengal, India

Jhargram Raj was a zamindari (feudatory kingdom) which occupied a position in Bengal region (present-day West Bengal, India) of British India. The zamindari came into being during the later part of the 16th century when Man Singh of Amer was the Dewan/Subahdar of Bengal (1594–1606). Their territory was centered around present-day Jhargram district. Jhargram was never an independent territory since the chiefs of the family held it basically as the zamindars of the British Raj in India after Lord Cornwallis's Permanent Settlement of 1793. Although its owners were both rich and powerful, with the chiefs of the family holding the title of Raja, the Jhargram estate was not defined as a Princely State with freedom to decide its future course of action at the time of Indian independence in 1947. Later, the Vice-Roy of India agreed to recognize Jhargram as "Princely State" after the Second World War, but the proposal taken back as the British had decided to give independence to India.

== History ==
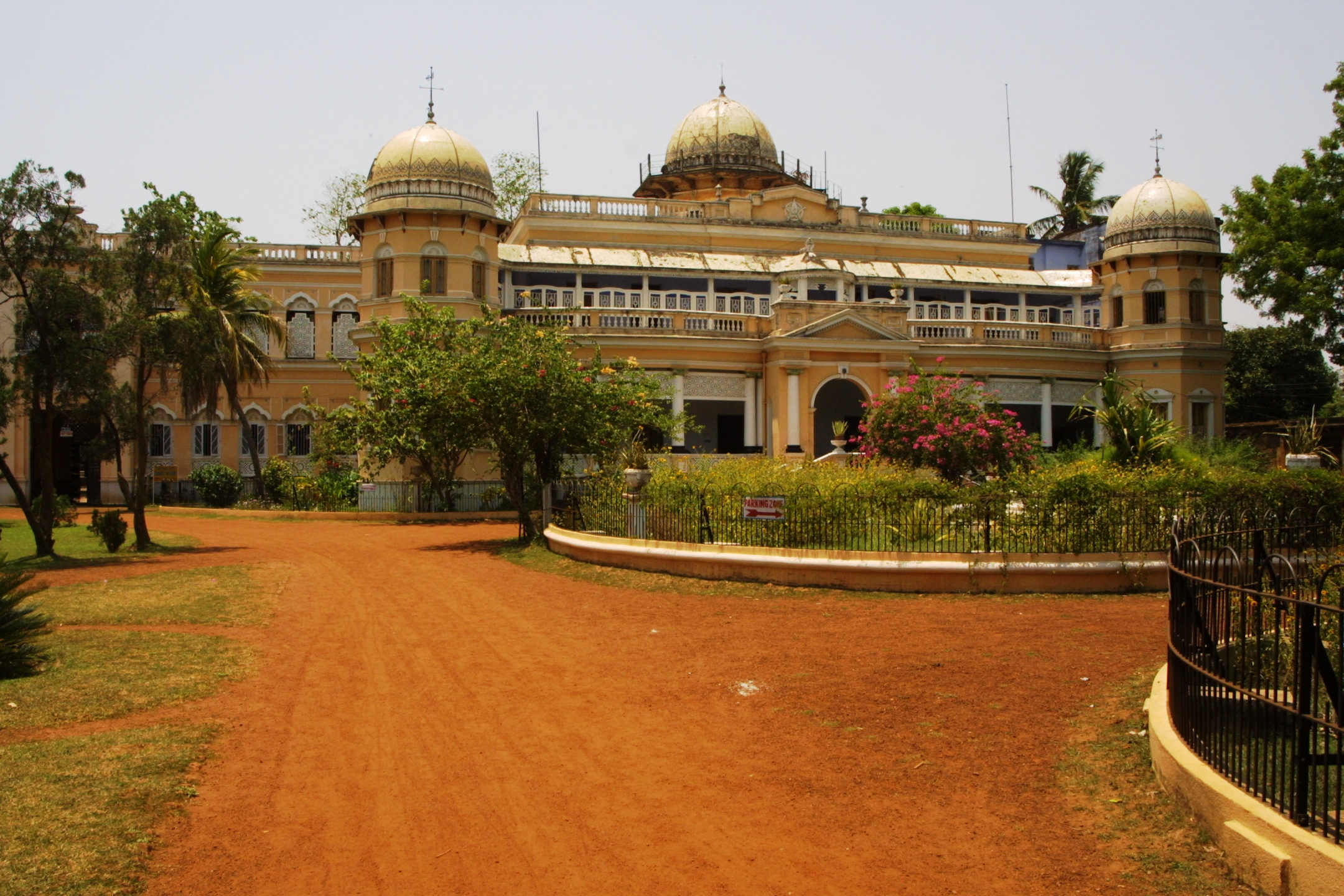
Palace of the Rajas

Jhargram Raj was founded around 1592 AD by Sarveshwar Singh who along with his elder brother were Generals under Man Singh of Amer and came to conquer Bengal when Emperor Akbar granted Subehdari of Bengal, Bihar, and Orissa to Raja Man Singh. He defeated and vanquished the local Mal tribal kings who were ruling the region known as Junglekhand, even today in order to commemorate this victory, every year an idol of Mal Raja is made and slain on Vijayadashami day. As a reward, Raja Man Singh, granted mansabdari of the entire region of Junglekhand to his victorious generals Sarveshwar Singh and his elder brother, under suzerainty and subordination as a tributary vassal state to the Mughal Emperor Akbar. He named his capital Jhargram which means a village surrounded by deep forests, hence the rulers of Jhargram assumed the title “Malla Deb”.

== Administration ==
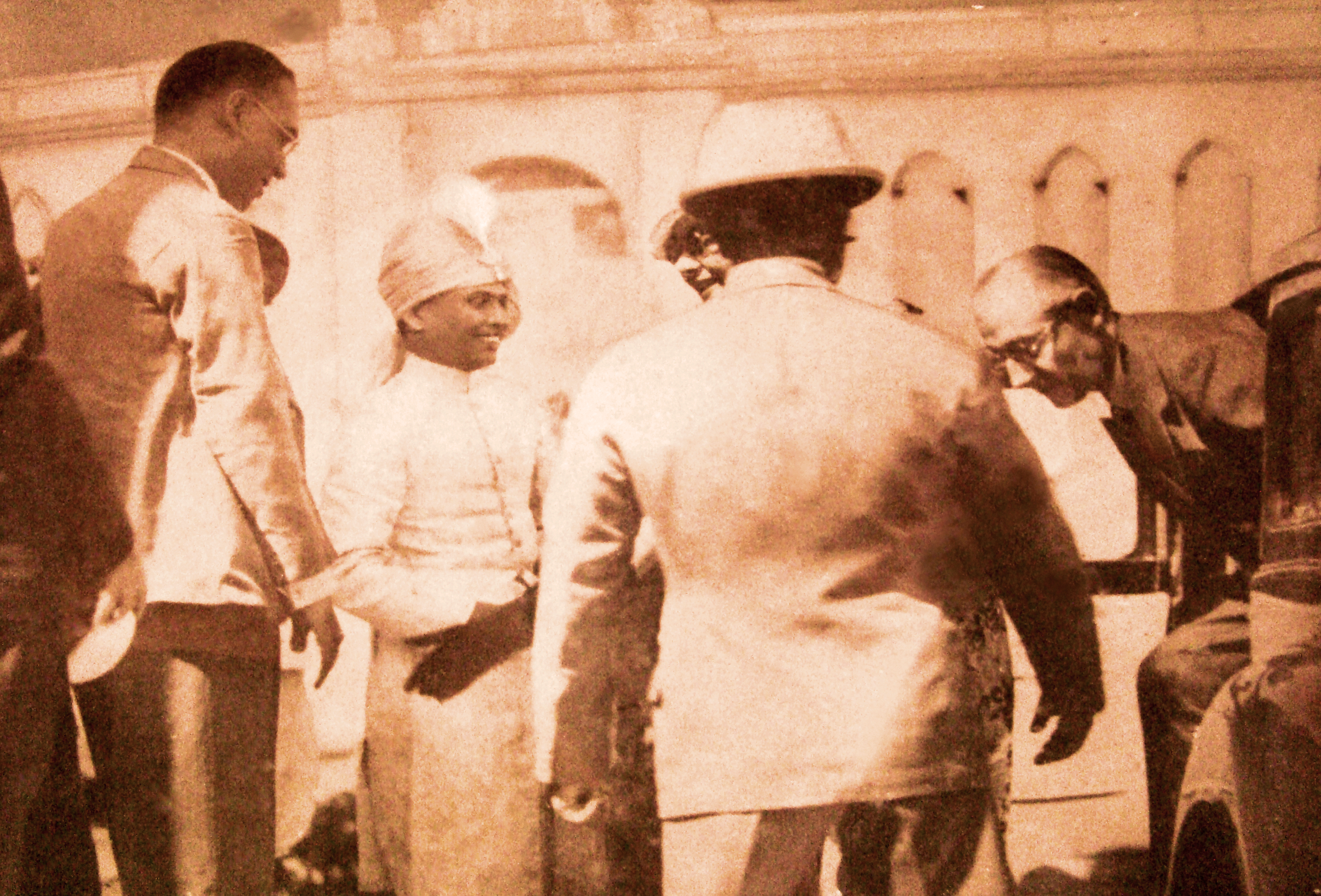
The Governor of Bengal at Jhargram Palace

The royal family were Zamindars of Jhargram under the British government rule, they were politically powerful and financially wealthy. The Zamindar was conferred with the title of Raja and was appointed to the Legislative Council of Bengal. The Zamindari ruled their dominions and estates from Jhargram Palace in present-day West Bengal, they had 8 sardars under the system and one Sub Zamindar of Beliaberah.

The period 1922–1950 was considered as the golden era for Jhargram Raj, with Rai Bahadur Debendra Mohan Bhattacharya as the Dewan, Jhargram developed into a township, and many educational institutions were established. The Jhargram Kumud Kumari Institution was founded in 1924. In 1925, an annual sports fund was created to encourage athletic activities and to construct a football stadium and the Jhargram Club. Raja Bahadur established Jhargram Agricultural College, which was later renamed Jhargram Raj College, as well as Vidyasagar Polytechnic for industrial training. He provided funds to set up Sri Ramkrishna Saradapeeth Girls High School and Bharat Sevashram Sangha. In 1931, he commissioned a new palace on 23 acres of land; it is a prominent example of Indo-Saracenic architecture. During World War II, he constructed Dudhkundi Airfield for the United States Air Force and provided the Allied forces with elephants, vehicles, and other help.

== Legacy of the Raj family ==
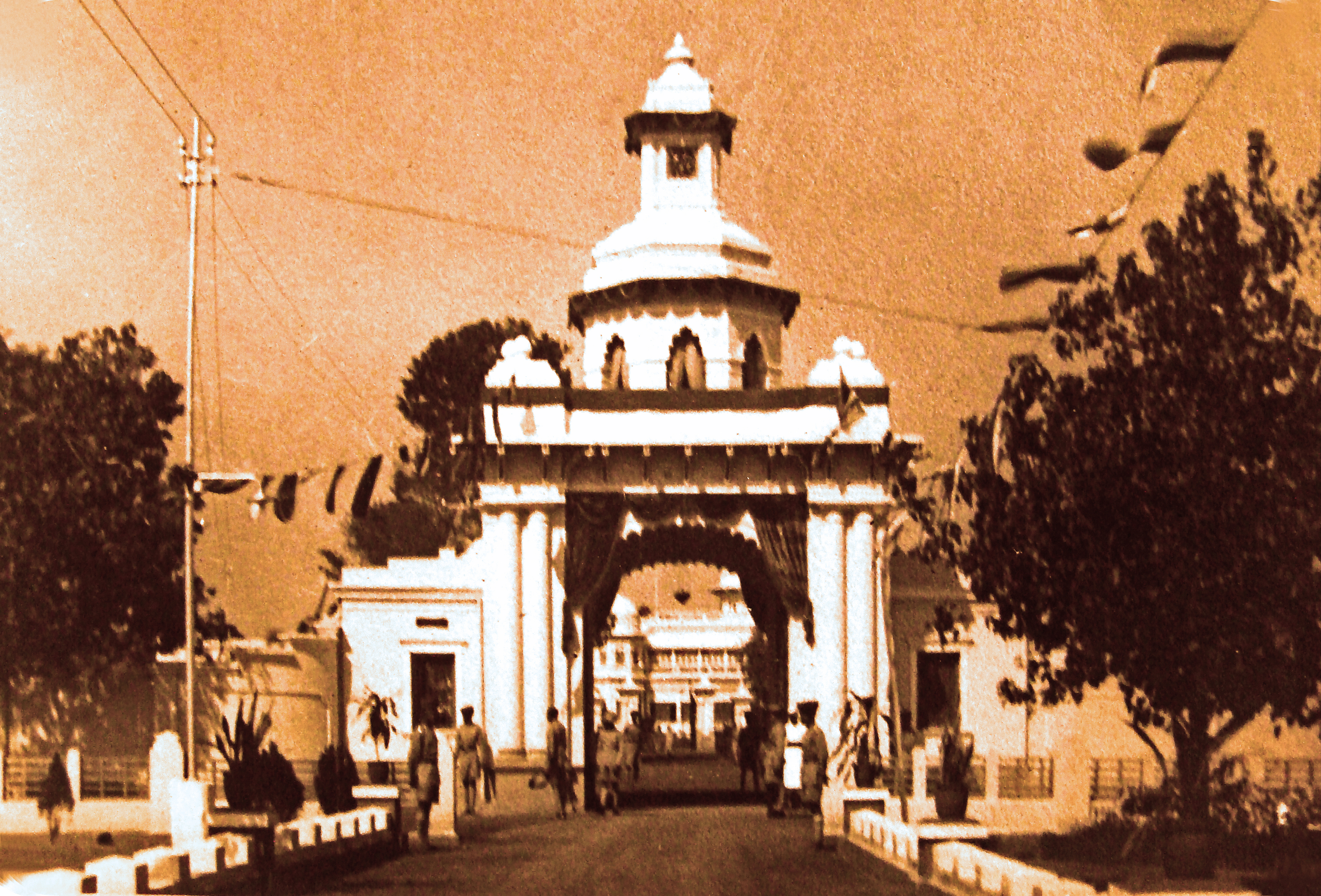
Singhdwar of Jhargram Palace

The last and the 16th king Raja Narasingha Malla Deb reigned from 1916 until his royal powers were abolished by an amendment to the Constitution of India in 1954. After losing his royal title, he served for two terms as a member of the Legislative Council of Bengal. He also served in the Lok Sabha, the lower house of the Indian Parliament.

The royal family was known for working to rehabilitate refugees after the partition of India. After India gained its independence, they owned a business in Kolkata and large real estate properties in Kolkata, Midnapore, and Digha. Narsingha's son Yuvraj Birendra Bijoy got involved in politics and was a two-time member of the Legislative Assembly of West Bengal from Jhargram's Vidhan Sabha constituency, representing the Indian National Congress. His son Shivendra Bijoy Malla Deb—Narasingha Malla Deb's grandson—is a social worker and politician associated with the All India Trinamool Congress, and the chairman of the municipality of Jhargram. They currently reside in Jhargram Palace and have converted about 15 rooms on the ground floor into a Heritage Hotel run by them.

== See also ==
- Political integration of India

== Further study ==
- The Indian princes and their states Author Barbara Ramusack ISBN 978-0-521-26727-4
