= Pulin Bihari Baske =

Indian politician

Dr. Pulin Bihari Baske

Member of Parliament, Lok Sabha
- In office 2009 - 2014
- Preceded by: Rupchand Murmu
- Succeeded by: Uma Saren
- Constituency: Jhargram, West Bengal

Personal details
- Born: 25 April 1968 (age 58) Menkapur, Dantan, Jhargram, West Bengal
- Party: CPI(M)
- Education: Medical College and Hospital, Kolkata
- Profession: Medical practitioner, politician

Dr. Pulin Bihari Baske is an Indian Politician and was Member of Parliament of the 15th Lok Sabha of India. He represented the Jhargram constituency of West Bengal and is a member of the Communist Party of India (Marxist) political party.

== Early life and education ==
Pulin Baske was born in Dantan, (West Bengal). After completing MBBS from Kolkata Medical College, he started working as a Medical practitioner with Ramkrishna Mission Lok Shiksha Parisad in Narendrapur, West Bengal.

== Political career ==
Pulin Baske was a first time M.P. Prior to this, he held other Zila Parishad posts.

Electoral history
Election	House	Constituency	Party	Votes	%	Result
2021	West Bengal Assembly	Keshiary	CPI(M)	9,270	4.36	Lost
2016	West Bengal Assembly	Gopiballavpur	CPI(M)	50,765	28.09	Lost
2014	Lok Sabha	Jhargram	CPI(M)	326,621	25.97	Lost
2009	Lok Sabha	Jhargram	CPI(M)	545,231	56.89	Won

== Posts Held ==
#	From	To	Position
01	1998	2002	Chairman, Medinipur Zila Parishad
02	2002	2008	Chairman, Paschim Medinipur Zila Parishad
03	2009	2014	Member, 15th Lok Sabha
04	2009	2014	Member, Committee on Rural Development
05	2013	2014	Member, Committee on Members of Parliament Local Area Development Scheme

== See also ==
- 15th Lok Sabha
- Politics of India
- Parliament of India
- Government of India
- Communist Party of India (Marxist)
- Jhargram (Lok Sabha constituency)
