= Hatiasuli =

Village in West Bengal

Hatiasuli

Hatiasuli is a small village located in the Jamboni CD block in the Jhargram subdivision of the Jhargram district in the state of West Bengal, India.

Country	India
State	West Bengal
District	Jhargram
Police station	Jamboni
Block	Jamboni
Gram panchayat	Kapgari
Post office	Kapgari
Population (2011)
• Total	881
Languages
• Official	Bengali, Santali, English
Time zone	UTC+5:30 (IST)
• Pin	721505
Lok Sabha constituency	Jhargram
Vidhan Sabha constituency	Binpur
Website	jhargram.gov.in

The village has an area of 204.7 hectares and as at 2011 a population of 881.
