= Sijua (disambiguation) =

Sijua is a census town in Dhanbad district, Jharkhand, India.

Sijua may also refer to:

- Sijua (moth), a genus of moths of the family Thyrididae from Africa
- Sijua, Jhargram, a village in Binpur I CD Block, Jhargram district, West Bengal, India
- Sijua Area, operational area of BCCL
- Sijua, Bokaro is a census town in Bokaro district, Jharkhand, India.
- Sijhua, a village in Chas CD Block, Bokaro district, Jharkhand, India
