= Debnath Hansda =

Indian politician

Member of the West Bengal Legislative Assembly
- In office 2 May 2021 – 4 May 2026
- Preceded by: Khagendranath Hembram
- Succeeded by: Pranat Tudu
- Constituency: Binpur

Personal details
- Party: AITC
- Profession: Politician

Debnath Hansda is an Indian politician member of All India Trinamool Congress. He is an MLA, elected from the Binpur constituency in the 2021 West Bengal Legislative Assembly election.
