= Binpur I =

- Community development block
- Coordinates: 22.59125°N 87.05431°E
- Country: India
- State: West Bengal
- District: Jhargram

Government
  - Type: Federal democracy

Area
  - Total: 357.62 km^{2} (138.08 sq mi)
- Elevation: 82 m (269 ft)

Population (2011)
  - Total: 156,153
  - Density: 436.65/km^{2} (1,130.9/sq mi)

Languages
  - Official: Bengali, Santali, Kudmali/Kurmali, English
- Time zone: UTC+5:30 (IST)
- PIN: 721502 (Binpur); 721504 (Dahijuri); 721516 (Lalgarh); 721141 (Ramgarh)
- Area code: 03221
- ISO 3166 code: IN-WB
- Vehicle registration: WB-49
- Literacy: 69.74%
- Lok Sabha constituency: Jhargram
- Vidhan Sabha constituency: Jhargram
- Website: jhargram.gov.in binpur1.org

Binpur I is a community development block that forms an administrative division in Jhargram subdivision of Jhargram district in the Indian state of West Bengal.

== History ==
=== Lalgarh movement ===
The Lalgarh movement started attracting attention after the failed assassination attempt on Buddhadeb Bhattacharjee, then chief minister of West Bengal, in the Salboni area, on 2 November 2008 and the police action that followed. The movement was not just a political struggle but an armed struggle that concurrently took the look of a social struggle. A large number of CPI(M) activists, and others active in different political parties, were killed. Although the epi-centre of the movement was Lalgarh, it was spread across 19 police stations in three adjoining districts – Paschim Medinipur, Bankura and Purulia, all thickly forested and near the border with Jharkhand. The deployment of CRPF and other forces started on 11 June 2009. The movement came to an end after the 2011 state assembly elections and change of government in West Bengal. The death of Kishenji, the Maoist commander, on 24 November 2011 was the last major landmark.

From 2009 Maoist violence had rapidly spread across eleven western CD blocks of the district: Binpur I, Binpur II, Salboni, Grahbeta II, Jamboni, Jhargram, Midnapore Sadar, Gopiballavpur I, Gopiballavpur II, Sankrail and Nayagram.

=== Netai killings ===
Indiscriminate firing allegedly from a CPI (M) activist's house killed 9 people in Netai village on 7 January 2011. As of 2016, the case is sub-judice.

=== Red corridor ===
106 districts spanning 10 states across India, described as being part of left wing extremism activities, constitute the Red corridor. In West Bengal the districts of Paschim Medinipur, Bankura, Purulia and Birbhum are part of the Red corridor. However, as of July 2016, there has been no reported incidents of Maoist related activities from these districts for the previous 4 years. In the period 2009-2011 LWE violence resulted in more than 500 deaths and a similar number missing in Paschim Medinipur district.

== Geography ==
The Chota Nagpur Plateau gradually slopes down creating an undulating area with infertile laterite rocks/ soil. In Binpur I CD block 70% of the cultivated area has lateritic soil and 30% has alluvial soil. Binpur I CD block is drought prone with a particularly severe drought situation.

Lalgarh is located at 22°35′29″N 87°03′16″E.

Binpur I CD block is bounded by Sarenga CD block in Bankura district in the north, Garhbeta II, Salboni and Midnapore Sadar CD blocks in the east, Jhargram and Jamboni CD blocks in the south and Binpur II CD block in the west.

It is located 39 km from Midnapore, the district headquarters.

Binpur I CD block has an area of 357.62 km^{2}. It has 1 panchayat samity, 10 gram panchayats, 115 gram sansads (village councils), 553 mouzas and 427 inhabited villages. Lalgarh police station serves this block. Headquarters of this CD block is at Lalgarh.

Binpur I CD block had a forest cover of 8,240 hectares, against a total geographical area of 36,243 hectares in 2005–06.

Gram panchayats of Binpur I block/ panchayat samiti are: Andharia, Belatikri, Binpur, Boita, Dahijuri, Dharampur, Lalgarh, Nepuria, Ramgarh and Sijua.

== Demographics ==
=== Population ===
According to the 2011 Census of India Binpur I CD block had a total population of 156,153, all of which were rural. There were 78,929 (51%) males and 77,224 (49%) females. Population in the age range 0–6 years was 18,854. Scheduled Castes numbered 39,064 (25.02%) and Scheduled Tribes numbered 43,962 (28.15%).

According to the 2001 census, Binpur I block had a total population of 139,136, out of which 71,072 were males and 68,064 were females. Binpur I block registered a population growth of 13.86 per cent during the 1991-2001 decade. Decadal growth for the combined Midnapore district was 14.87 per cent. Decadal growth in West Bengal was 17.45 per cent.

Large village (with 4,000+ population) in Binpur I CD block is (2011 census figure in brackets): Lalgarh (4,433).

Other villages in Binpur I CD block are (2011 census figures in brackets): Binpur (1,842), Andharia (751), Sijua (2,263), Ramgarh (3,734), Netai (1,946), Baita (199), Bila Tikri (2,564), Dahijuri (3,237) and Dharampur (712).

=== Literacy ===
According to the 2011 census the total number of literate persons in Binpur I CD block was 95,753 (69.74% of the population over 6 years) out of which males numbered 55,228 (79.72% of the male population over 6 years) and females numbered 40,525 (59.58% of the female population over 6 years). The gender gap in literacy rates was 20.14%.

See also – List of West Bengal districts ranked by literacy rate

Literacy in CD blocks of
Paschim Medinipur district
Jhargram subdivision
Binpur I – 69.74%
Binpur II – 70.46%
Gopiballavpur I – 65.44%
Gopiballavpur II – 71.40%
Jamboni – 72.63%
Jhargram – 72.23%
Nayagram – 63.70%
Sankrail – 73.35%
Medinipur Sadar subdivision
Garhbeta I – 72.21%
Garhbeta II – 75.87%
Garhbeta III – 73.42%
Keshpur – 77.88%
Midnapore Sadar – 70.48%
Salboni – 74.87%
Ghatal subdivision
Chandrakona I – 78.93%
Chandrakona II – 75.96%
Daspur I – 83.99%
Daspur II – 85.62%
Ghatal – 81.08%
Kharagpur subdivision
Dantan I – 73.53%
Dantan II – 82.45%
Debra – 82.03%
Keshiari – 76.78%
Kharagpur I – 77.06%
Kharagpur II – 76.08%
Mohanpur – 80.51%
Narayangarh – 78.31%
Pingla – 83.57%
Sabang – 86.84%
2011 Census: CD Block Wise

Primary Census Abstract Data

=== Language and religion ===
Religion in Binpur I CD block (2011)
Hinduism	77.47%
Other (tribal religion)	16.29%
Islam	3.89%
Other or not stated	2.35%

In the 2011 census Hindus numbered 120,976 and formed 77.47% of the population in Binpur I CD block. Muslims numbered 6,073 and formed 3.89% of the population. Others numbered 29,104 and formed 18.64% of the population. Others include Addi Bassi, Marang Boro, Santal, Saranath, Sari Dharma, Sarna, Alchchi, Bidin, Sant, Saevdharm, Seran, Saran, Sarin, Kheria, Christians and other religious communities. In 2001, Hindus were 69.66%, Muslims 3.81% and tribal religions 26.32% of the population respectively.

Languages of Binpur I CD block (2011)
1. Bengali (76.6%)
2. Santali (22.3%)
3. Others (1.09%)

At the time of the 2011 census, 76.63% of the population spoke Bengali and 22.28% Santali as their first language.

== BPL families ==
In Binpur I CD block 47.46% families were living below poverty line in 2007.

According to the District Human Development Report of Paschim Medinipur: The 29 CD blocks of the district were classified into four categories based on the poverty ratio. Nayagram, Binpur II and Jamboni CD blocks have very high poverty levels (above 60%). Kharagpur I, Kharagpur II, Sankrail, Garhbeta II, Pingla and Mohanpur CD blocks have high levels of poverty (50-60%), Jhargram, Midnapore Sadar, Dantan I, Gopiballavpur II, Binpur I, Dantan II, Keshiari, Chandrakona I, Gopiballavpur I, Chandrakona II, Narayangarh, Keshpur, Ghatal, Sabang, Garhbeta I, Salboni, Debra and Garhbeta III CD blocks have moderate levels of poverty (25-50%) and Daspur II and Daspur I CD blocks have low levels of poverty (below 25%).

== Economy ==
=== Infrastructure ===
423 or 76% of mouzas in Binpur I CD block were electrified by 31 March 2014.

427 mouzas in Binpur I CD block had drinking water facilities in 2013–14. There were 34 fertiliser depots, 24 seed stores and 52 fair price shops in the CD block.

=== Agriculture ===
Persons engaged in agriculture
in Binpur I CD block
1. Bargadars (3.82%)
2. Patta holders (23.6%)
3. Small farmers (2.65%)
4. Marginal farmers (23.4%)
5. Agricultural labourers (46.5%)

Although the Bargadari Act of 1950 recognised the rights of bargadars to a higher share of crops from the land that they tilled, it was not fully implemented. Large tracts, beyond the prescribed limit of land ceiling, remained with the rich landlords. From 1977 onwards major land reforms took place in West Bengal. Land in excess of land ceiling was acquired and distributed amongst the peasants. Following land reforms land ownership pattern has undergone transformation. In 2013–14, persons engaged in agriculture in Binpur I CD block could be classified as follows: bargadars 3.82%, patta (document) holders 23.62%, small farmers (possessing land between 1 and 2 hectares) 2.65%, marginal farmers (possessing land up to 1 hectare) 23.37% and agricultural labourers 46.54%.

In 2005-06 net cropped area in Binpur I CD block was 36,243 hectares and the area in which more than one crop was grown was 15,377 hectares.

The extension of irrigation has played a role in growth of the predominantly agricultural economy. In 2013–14, the total area irrigated in Binpur I CD block was 8,340 hectares, out of which 500 by canal water, 350 hectares by tank water, 570 hectares by deep tube wells, 5,800 by shallow tube wells, 60 hectares by river lift irrigation, 260 hectares by open dug wells and 800 hectares by other methods.

In 2013–14, Binpur I CD block produced 132,024 tonnes of Aman paddy, the main winter crop, from 42,145 hectares, 154 tonnes of Aus paddy (summer crop)from 66 hectares, 2,484 tonnes of Boro paddy (spring crop) from 738 hectares, 1,151 tonnes of wheat from 400 hectares and 9,371 tonnes of potatoes from 571 hectares. It also produced maskalai, mustard and til. The production of Aman paddy was the highest amongst all the CD blocks in the district.

=== Banking ===
In 2013–14, Binpur I CD block had offices of 10 commercial banks and 1 gramin bank.

== Transport ==
Binpur I CD block has 6 ferry services and 15 originating/ terminating bus routes. The block headquarters are 42 km from nearest railway station.

== Education ==
In 2013–14, Binpur I CD block had 137 primary schools with 9,247 students, 20 middle schools with 1,679 students and 16 higher secondary schools with 16,020 students. Binpur I CD block had 510 institutions for special and non-formal education with 10,896 students.

The United Nations Development Programme considers the combined primary and secondary enrolment ratio as the simple indicator of educational achievement of the children in the school going age. The infrastructure available is important. In Binpur I CD block out of the total 137 primary schools in 2008–2009, 67 had pucca buildings, 15 partially pucca, 1 kacha and 54 multiple type.

Lalgarh Government College was established in 2014 at Lalgarh. It is affiliated to Vidyasagar University. It offers honours courses in Bengali, Santali, English, Sanskrit, history, philosophy, political science and sociology, and general courses in BA and BSc (Bio Science).

== Healthcare ==
In 2014, Binpur I CD block had 1 rural hospital and 5 primary health centres with total 96 beds and 9 doctors. It had 33 family welfare sub centres and 1 family welfare centre. 7,066 patients were treated indoor and 121,258 patients were treated outdoor in the hospitals, health centres and subcentres of the CD Block.

Binpur Rural Hospital, with 30 beds at Binpur, is the major government medical facility in the Binpur I CD block. There is a primary health centre at: Laghata (PO Nachipore) (with 4 beds).
