= Matilal Hansda =

Indian politician (born 1945)

Member of parliament for 7th, 8th and 9th Lok Sabha
- In office 1980–1991
- Preceded by: Jadunath Kisku
- Succeeded by: Rupchand Murmu
- Constituency: Jhargram, West Bengal

Personal details
- Born: 15 June 1945 (age 80) Benachapra, Midnapore, Bengal Presidency, British India
- Party: CPI(M)
- Spouse: Belarani Hansda
- Children: 4 sons

Matilal Hansda is an Indian politician and a member of the Communist Party of India (Marxist) political party. He was elected to the Lok Sabha, lower house of the Parliament of India in 1980, 1984 and 1989 from Jhargram constituency in West Bengal.
