= Lalgarh, Jhargram =

Lalgarh
- Census Town
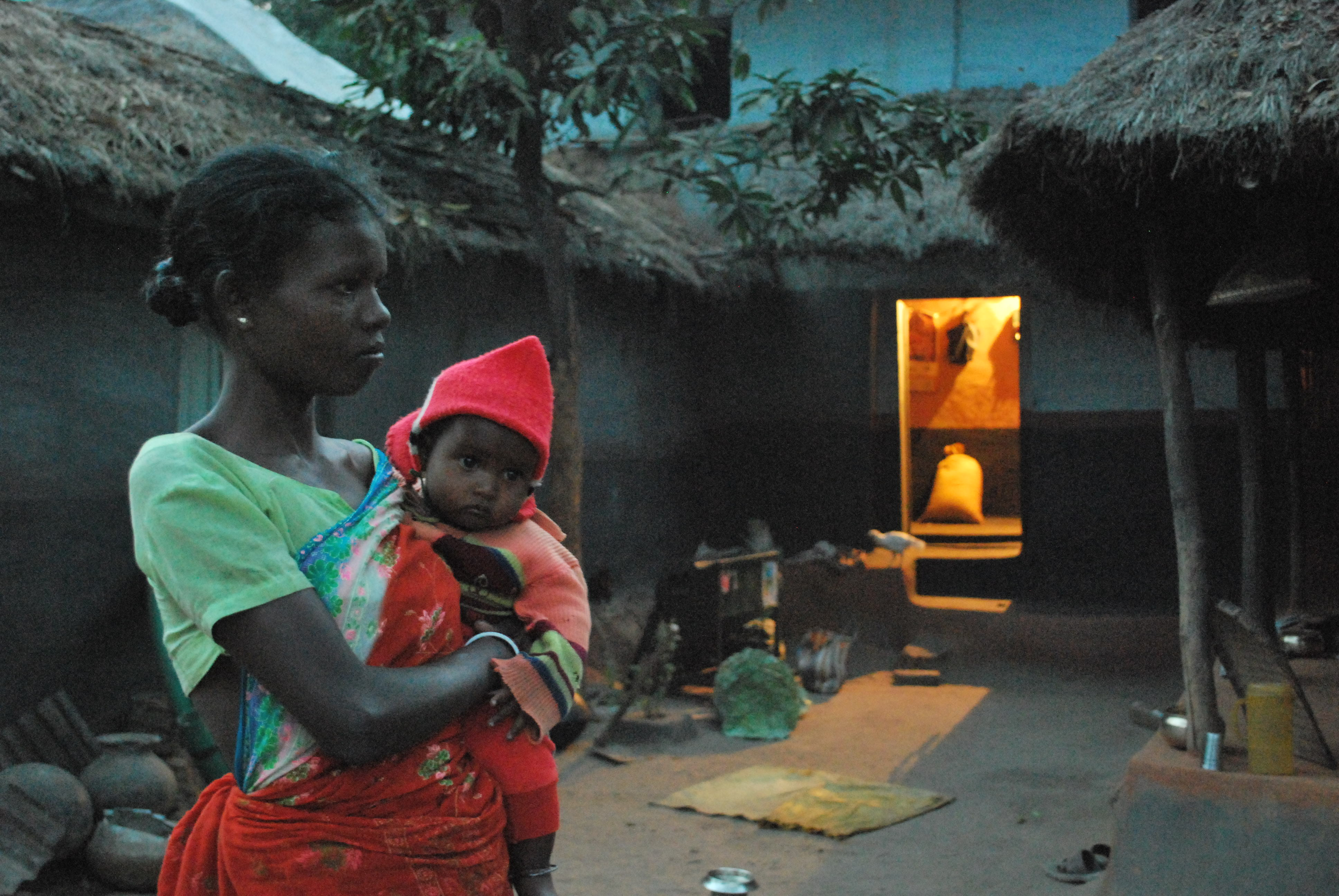
- Mother and child

- Location in West Bengal, India Lalgarh (India)
- Coordinates: 22.58°N 87.05°E
- Country: India
- State: West Bengal
- District: Jhargram

Government
  - Body: Gram panchayat

Population (2016)
  - Total: 5,216

Languages
  - Official: Bengali, Santhali, English
- Time zone: UTC+5:30 (IST)
- ISO 3166 code: IN-WB
- Vehicle registration: WB 49/50
- Website: jhargram.gov.in

Lalgarh is a small town and a gram panchayat in the Binpur I CD block under the Jhargram subdivision of the Jhargram district in the Indian state of West Bengal.

Lalgarh came under media attention at the beginning of November 2008. The Communist Party of India (Maoist) launched a massive fight against police personnel and cadres of the Communist Party of India (Marxist). In June 2009 Indian security forces launched Operation Lalgarh against the Maoists in the village.

== Geography ==
Cities and towns in Jhargram subdivision of Jhargram district
CT: census town, R: rural/ urban centre, H: historical/ religious centre
Owing to space constraints in the small map, the actual locations in a larger map may vary slightly

=== Location ===
Lalgarh is located at 22.58°N 87.05°E

=== Area overview ===
Jhargram subdivision, the only one in Jhargram district, shown in the map alongside, is composed of hills, mounds and rolling lands. It is rather succinctly described in the District Human Development Report, 2011 (at that time it was part of Paschim Medinipur district), “The western boundary is more broken and picturesque, for the lower ranges of the Chhotanagpur Hills line the horizon, the jungle assumes the character of forest, and large trees begin to predominate. The soil, however, is lateritic, a considerable area is unproductive, almost uninhabited, especially in the extreme north-west where there are several hills over 1000 feet in height. The remainder of the country is an almost level plain broken only by the sand hills.” 3.48% of the population lives in urban areas and 96.52% lives in the rural areas. 20.11% of the total population belonged to scheduled castes and 29.37% belonged to scheduled tribes.

Note: The map alongside presents some of the notable locations in the subdivision. All places marked in the map are linked in the larger full screen map.

== Demography ==
According to the 2011 Census of India, Lalgarh had a total population of 4,433 of which 2,259 (51%) were males and 2,174 (49%) were females. Population in the age range 0–6 years was 455. The total number of literate persons in Lalgarh was 3,209 (72.39% of the population over 6 years).

== Civic administration ==
=== CD block HQ ===
The headquarters of Binpur I CD block are located at Lalgarh.

=== Police station ===
Lalgarh police station has jurisdiction over Binpur I CD block.

== Economy ==
The main occupation of the people here is cultivation, sharecropping and selling disposable plates made of leaves. Most people do not own land but work on others fields. The region is dry and there are but a single harvest each year. At other times people work as daily labor, collect and sell leaves and wood from forest etc. Over 75% of the households own land given to them under the Land reforms programme of the Left Front Government between the years 1977 and 2002. But income poverty exists.

== Operation Lalgarh ==
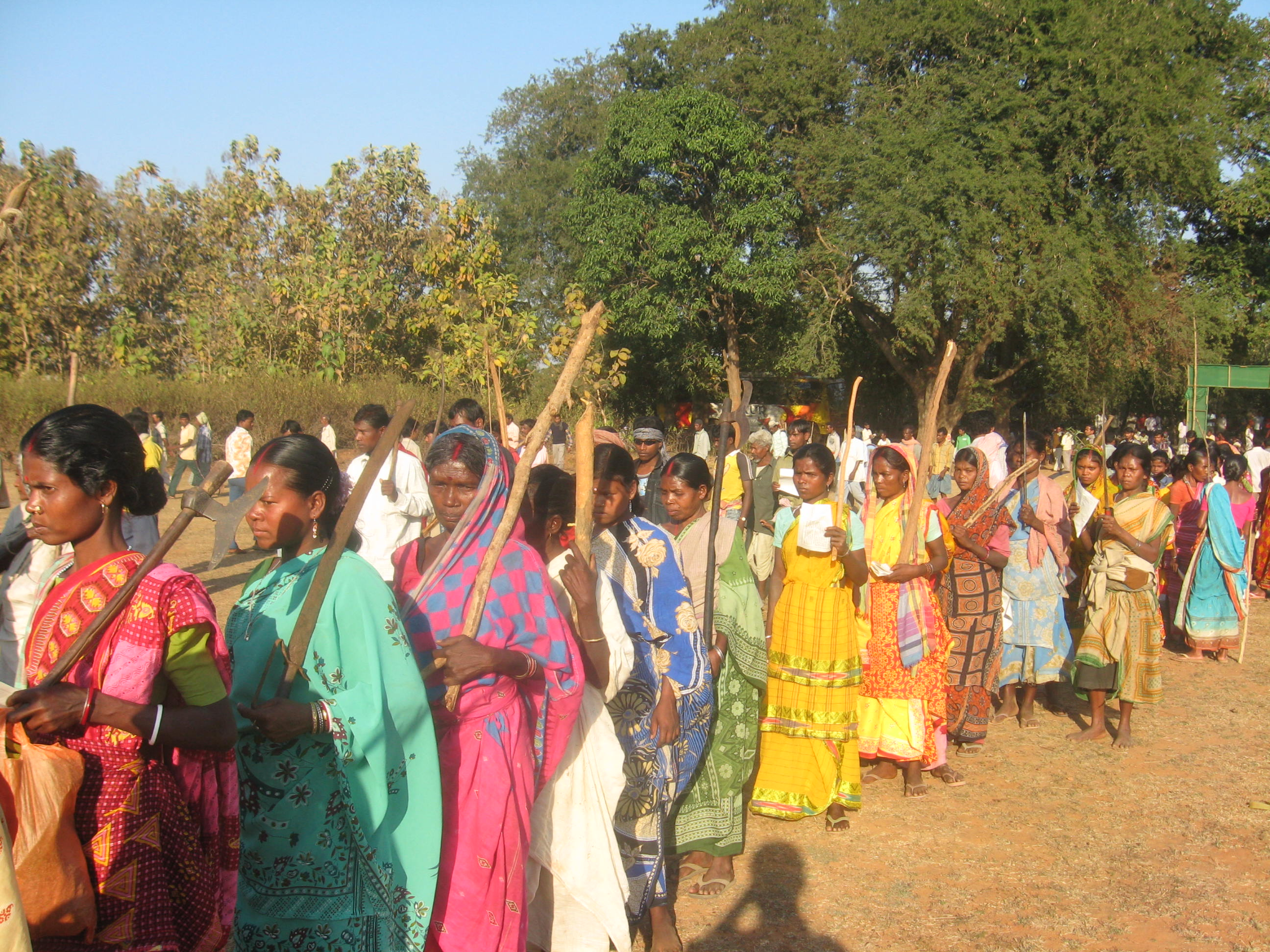
Lalgarh adivasi women

In November 2008, following reports of police brutality, enraged advasi villagers blockaded roads and protested against the police and paramilitary forces in the area. The government maintained the movement was being controlled by Maoist guerrilla agents. The Maoists controlled the village and the surrounding area for eight months until Operation Lalgarh was launched to dislodge them on 18 June 2009.

== Education ==
- Lalgarh Primary School
- Baghakuli Primary School
- Chunpara Primary School
- Lalgarh Ramkrishna Vidyalaya(H.S)
- Lalgarh Sarodamoni Balika Vidyalaya(H.S)
- Lalgarh Model School
- Lalgarh Government College, which was established in 2014. It is affiliated to Vidyasagar University, and offers honours courses in Bengali, Santali, English, Sanskrit, history, philosophy, political science and sociology, and general courses in BA and BSc (Bio Science).

== Healthcare ==
Binpur Rural Hospital, with 30 beds at Binpur, is the major government medical facility in the Binpur I CD block. Lalgarh PHC situated within town with 10 beds also serve major population of Lalgarh.

== See also ==
- Netai
- Dahijuri
- Binpur
