= Amiya Kumar Kisku =

Indian politician

Member of Parliament, Lok Sabha
- In office 1967–1977
- Preceded by: Subodh Chandra Hansda
- Succeeded by: Jadunath Kisku
- Constituency: Jhargram, West Bengal

Personal details
- Born: 14 October 1923 Bhimpore, Midnapore district, Bengal Presidency, British India
- Party: Indian National Congress
- Other political affiliations: Bangla Congress
- Spouse: Kolika Kisku

Amiya Kumar Kisku (born 14 October 1923, date of death unknown) was an Indian politician and academic. He was elected to the Lok Sabha, lower house of the Parliament of India from Jhargram constituency in West Bengal. Kisku was also an academic, specialising in the study of indigenous people, particularly the tribes of West Bengal, Bihar, Orissa, and Assam. He later served as the Secretary General of the Indian Confederation of Indigenous and Tribal Peoples (ICITP). In 2007, it was noted that Kisku is deceased.
