= Bagmari (Midnapore) =

- Village
- Location in West Bengal, India
- Coordinates: 22.58°N 87.05°E
- Country: India
- State: West Bengal
- District: Medinipur

Area
  - Total: 10 km^{2} (3.9 sq mi)

Languages
  - Official: Bengali, English
- Time zone: UTC+5:30 (IST)
- Postal code: 721129

Bagmari is a village in Garmal 10–I community development block under the Salboni of Paschim Medinipur district in the Indian state of West Bengal.

== Demography ==
Bagmari is a sparsely populated place with the majority of population being adivasis.

== Economy ==
The main occupation of the people here is cultivation, sharecropping and selling disposable plates made of leaves. Most people do not own land but work on others fields. The region is dry and there are but a single harvest each year. At other times people work as daily labor, collect and sell leaves and wood from forest etc. Over 75% of the households own land given to them under the Land reforms programme of the Left Front Government between the years 1977 and 2002. But income poverty exists.

== Climate ==
Moderate. Ghatal is a flood-prone area and flooded by the Shilaboti, Jhumi, Kethiya, Kansaboti and Rupnarayan rivers. Rice, potato and other vegetable farming are the main occupations of the people of this Subdivision.

== Transportation ==
Ghatal is well connected by roads/highways with nearby cities like Kolkata, Howrah, Midnapore, Kanthi, Digha, Burdwan, Bankura. For local transportation bus, minibus, cycle-rikshaws are available. Midnapore railway station is the nearest important station about 10 km from the village.
