= Jhargram Raj Palace =

Palace in Jhargram district, West Bengal, India

Jhargram Palace
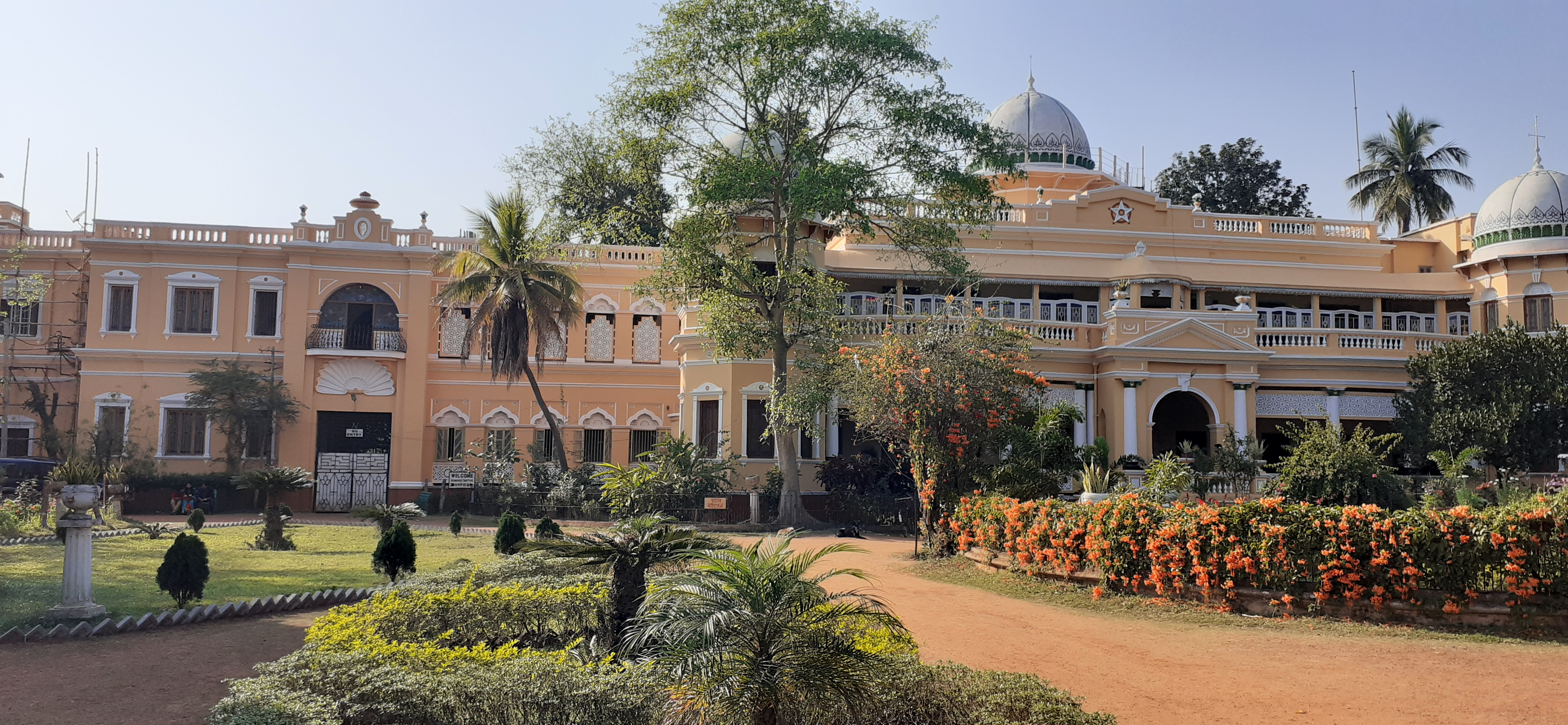
- The façade of Jhargram Rajbari

General information
- Architectural style: Italian
- Location: Jhargram, West Bengal, India

Design and construction
- Architects: Late Khytish Chandra Biswas, the then Chief Valuer of Calcutta Improvement Trust

Website
- http://www.jhargrampalace.com

The Jhargram Raj Palace, also known as Jhargram Rajbari, is the current residence of the Malla Deb royal family. Situated in Jhargram district, West Bengal. About 15 rooms on the ground floor have been converted into a Heritage Hotel managed by the West Bengal Tourism Development Corporation Ltd.

== History ==
Raja Man Singh, granted mansabdari of the entire region of Junglekhand to his victorious generals Sarveshwar Singh Chauhan and his elder brother, under suzerainty and subordination as a tributary vassal state to the Mughal Emperor Akbar. He named his capital Jhargram which means 'a village surrounded by deep forests', hence the rulers of Jhargram assumed the title "Malla Deb".

In 1799, the ruler of Jhargram, revolted against the East India Company along with rulers of Bishnupur and others and the revolt was termed as Chuar Mutiny. The ruler was forced to surrender and the status Jhargram kingdom made to a Zamindari estate under the British authority. The kingdom had eight sardars under the system and one Sub Zamindar of Beliaberah.

The royal family ruled their dominions and estates from Jhargram Palace. The kingdom had its golden era during the reign of Raja Narasingha Malla Deb, under the guidance of his mentor and Dewan Rai Bahadur Debendra Mohan Bhattacharya, he developed Jhargram town into a modern planned township and commissioned the new Palace in 1931 which is one of the finest example of Indo Saracenic architecture in Eastern India and spread over 30 acres.

== Architecture ==
The Main Building is impressive. The Jhargram Raj Palace is an opulent Italianate structure, set in carefully laid lawns and gardens. The Palace was restructured in 1931 CE, by the Calcutta Improvement Trust during the reign of Raja Narasingha Malla Deb Bahadur. In the Palace campus, so evocative of a regal lifestyle, the past comes alive.

The Palatial Guest House is a part of the Jhargram Raj Palace it has been a host to several dignitaries right from its inception some of the dignitaries who have officially stayed in this building as per the records are:

- Lord Willingdon, the British Viceroy of India
- Sir John Arthur Herbert, the Governor of Bengal
- Lord Richard Casey, the Governor of Bengal;
- Chakravarti Rajagopalachari
- Prafulla Chandra Ghosh
- Bidhan Chandra Ray
- Lal Bahadur Shastri
- Morarji Desai
- General Cariappa
- Uttam Kumar
- Saiyid Nurul Hasan
- Pranab Mukherjee
- Mamata Banerjee

== Heritage tourism ==
The proprietors of Jhargram Palace have converted a part of the palace into a heritage hotel. It is maintained by the West Bengal Tourism Development Corporation Ltd, called the Jhargram Rajbari Tourism Project. Other tourism infrastructures in and around the palace which is boosting tourism in West Bengal.

== See also ==
- Jhargram Raj
- Narasingha Malla Deb
