= Birbaha Hansda =

Indian politician and former actress

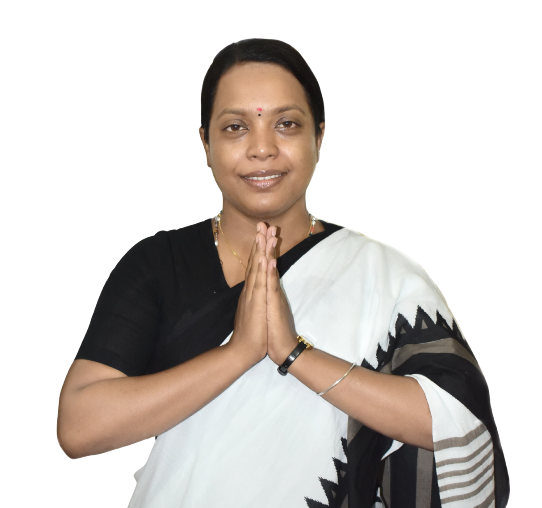
- Birbaha Hansda

Cabinet Minister, Government of West Bengal
- In office 10 May 2021 – 7 May 2026
- Governor: Jagdeep Dhankhar; La. Ganesan (additional charge); C. V. Ananda Bose; R. N. Ravi
- Chief Minister: Mamata Banerjee
- Ministry: Department of Self Help Group & Self-Employment (I/C); Department of Forests (I/C)
- Preceded by: Jyotipriya Mallick

Member of West Bengal Legislative Assembly
- In office 6 May 2021 – 3 May 2026
- Preceded by: Sukumar Hansda
- Succeeded by: Lakshmikant Sahu
- Constituency: Jhargram

Personal details
- Born: 1982 or 1983 (age 43–44) Binpur, West Bengal, India
- Party: Trinamool Congress (2021–present)
- Other political affiliations: Jharkhand Party (Naren)
- Parents: Naren Hansda (father); Chunibala Hansda (mother)
- Occupation: Actress; politician
- Awards: Best Actress, Santali Film Fair Award 2008-2012

Birbaha Hansda is an Indian politician and former actress who has served as Cabinet Minister for Self Help Group & Self-Employment and Minister of State for Forests and Consumer Affairs of the Government of West Bengal. In 2025 she is the Minister of State for Forest and Minister of state for Consumer Affairs, Government of West Bengal and the Member of Legislative Assembly of Jhargram constituency. As an actress, Hansda has appeared predominantly in Santali language films as well as acted in a few Bengali and Hindi language films.

== Early life ==
Hansda was born in Aankro village in the Indian state of West Bengal in a Santal family. Her late father Naren Hansda was the founder of the Jharkhand Party (Naren). Her father and her mother Chunibala Hansda were members of the West Bengal Legislative Assembly. Hansda participated in the elections.

She completed her higher secondary at Ghatshila College, and graduated from the University of Calcutta. She started acting at an early age.

== Acting career ==
Hansda began working with actress and producer Prem Mardi. She has acted in eight Santali films. Her 2008 debut film was Ado Alom Aso Aa'।. She received praise for her performance. Her other films include Achchha Thik Geya, Aas Tanhe Ena Amre, Amge Sari Dulariya (2012), Tode Sutam (2013), Jupur Juli, Aalom Rejinya Sakom Sindoor (2013), Jawai Orah Bongay Chapal Kiding (2014), Malang and Fulmoni (2010). She also recorded an album, Amko Jaway Kan Sanging Disom Re.

She has worked in songs and music videos, such as 'A Na Mosla Baha' (2014), 'A Dogor Na' (2014), 'Chag Cho Chando' (2014) and 'Gorom Sari Sari'.

== Political career ==
Hansda joined the Trinamool Congress in 2021 and won the 2021 West Bengal Legislative Assembly election from Jhargram as a candidate of AITC.

In 2022, she was made the Minister for Self Help Groups (SHGs) and Self Employment Department.

In 2025, she became West Bengal’s Minister of State for Forests.

In 2026, she was candidate from Binpur constituency but lost to Pranat Tudu of BJP.

== Awards ==
- From the year 2008 to 2012, the Santali Filmfare Award was received.
- RASCA Award
- Lastly, her film Fulmoni is 122nd in the Delhi International Film Competition, 2018.
- Reception from Chief Minister of West Bengal Mamata Banerjee, 2019.
