= Naren Hansda =

Indian politician

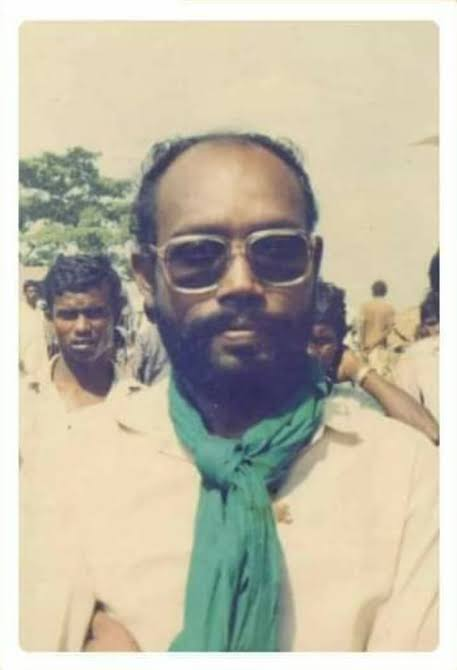

Member of West Bengal Legislative Assembly
- In office 20 June 1991 – 25 June 1999
- Preceded by: Durga Tudu
- Succeeded by: Chunibala Hansda
- Constituency: Binpur

Personal details
- Died: 25 June 1999
- Party: Jharkhand Party (Naren)
- Spouse: Chunibala Hansda
- Children: Birbaha Hansda

Naren Hansda was an Indian politician from West Bengal belonging to Jharkhand Party (Naren). He was the founder of Jharkhand Party (Naren).

== Biography ==
Hansda's wife Chunibala Hansda is a former member of the West Bengal Legislative Assembly. Their daughter Birbaha Hansda is an Indian politician; as of 2025, she serves as Cabinet Minister in the Government of West Bengal and is a former actress in the Santali film industry.

Hansda was elected as a member of the West Bengal Legislative Assembly as a Jharkhand Party candidate from Binpur in 1991. Later, he quit Jharkhand Party and founded Jharkhand Party (Naren). He was elected as a member of the West Bengal Legislative Assembly as a Jharkhand Party candidate from Binpur in 1996.

Hansda died on 25 June 1999.
