= Netai =

- Village
- Location in West Bengal, India Netai (India)
- Coordinates: 22°35′27″N 87°01′25″E
- Country: India
- State: West Bengal
- District: Jhargram

Population (2011)
  - Total: 1,946

Languages
  - Official: Bengali, Santali, English
- Time zone: UTC+5:30 (IST)
- Lok Sabha constituency: Jhargram
- Vidhan Sabha constituency: Jhargram
- Website: jhargram.gov.in

Netai is a village in the Binpur I CD block in the Jhargram subdivision of the Jhargram district in the state of West Bengal, India.

== Geography ==
Cities and towns in Jhargram subdivision of Jhargram district
CT: census town, R: rural/ urban centre, H: historical/ religious centre
Owing to space constraints in the small map, the actual locations in a larger map may vary slightly

=== Location ===
Netai is located at 22°35′21.5″N 87°01′22.8″E

=== Area overview ===
Jhargram subdivision, the only one in Jhargram district, shown in the map alongside, is composed of hills, mounds and rolling lands. It is rather succinctly described in the District Human Development Report, 2011 (at that time it was part of Paschim Medinipur district), “The western boundary is more broken and picturesque, for the lower ranges of the Chhotanagpur Hills line the horizon, the jungle assumes the character of forest, and large trees begin to predominate. The soil, however, is lateritic, a considerable area is unproductive, almost uninhabited, especially in the extreme north-west where there are several hills over 1000 feet in height. The remainder of the country is an almost level plain broken only by the sand hills.” 3.48% of the population lives in urban areas and 96.52% lives in the rural areas. 20.11% of the total population belonged to scheduled castes and 29.37% belonged to scheduled tribes.

Note: The map alongside presents some of the notable locations in the subdivision. All places marked in the map are linked in the larger full screen map.

== Demographics ==
According to the 2011 Census of India, Netai had a total population of 1,946 of which 987 (50%) were males and 959 (49%) were females. Population in the age range 0–6 years was 224. The total number of literate persons in Netai was 1,351 (69.42% of the population over 6 years).

== Politics ==
=== Netai killings ===
Indiscriminate firing allegedly from a CPI (M) activist's house killed 9 people in Netai village on 7 January 2011. CBI filed charge sheets against 20 people in May 2014. Of these 12 people arrested are directly linked to CPI(M).
