= Kunar Hembram =

Indian politician (1962–2024)

Member of Parliament, Lok Sabha
- In office 23 May 2019 – 4 June 2024
- Preceded by: Uma Saren
- Succeeded by: Kalipada Soren
- Constituency: Jhargram

Personal details
- Born: 23 September 1962 Jhargram, West Bengal
- Died: 21 September 2024 (age 61 years) Jhargram, West Bengal
- Party: Trinamool Congress (2024); Bharatiya Janata Party (until 2024)

Kunar Hembram (23 September 1962 – 21 September 2024), was an engineer turned Indian politician. He was elected to the Lok Sabha (the lower house of the Parliament of India) from Jhargram, West Bengal in the 2019 Indian general election as a member of the Bharatiya Janata Party. On 8 March 2024, he resigned from BJP.
