= Narasingha Malla Deb =

Indian politician (1907–1976)

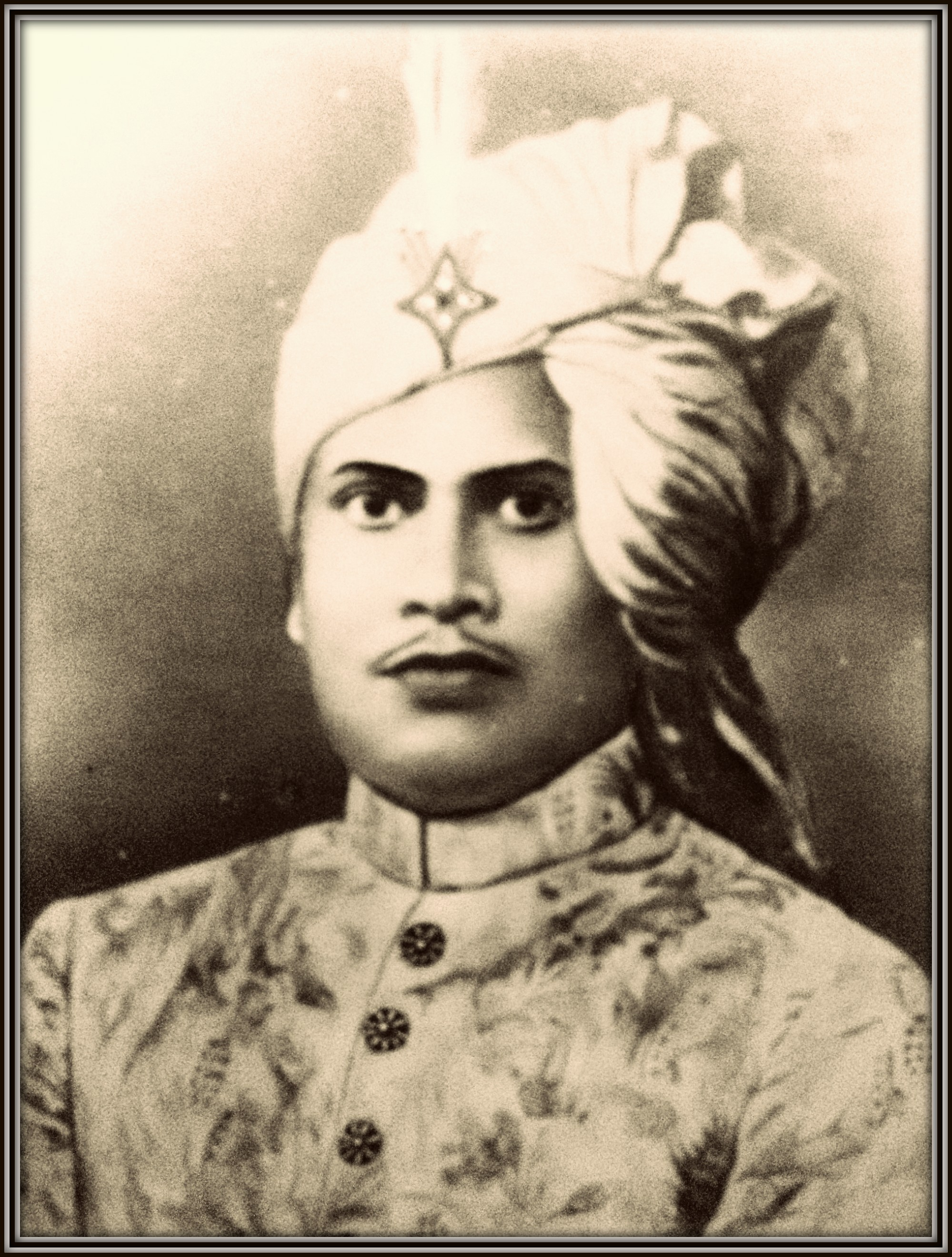
- Born: 22 January 1907; Jhargram, Bengal Presidency, British India
- Died: 11 November 1976 (aged 69); Calcutta, West Bengal, India
- Spouses: Binode Manjari Devi; Rupa Manjari Devi
- Children: 4

Narasingha Malla Deb, OBE (22 January 1907 – 11 November 1976) was an Indian politician who was a member of the Parliament of India and the 18th Raja of Jhargram.

== Early years and accession ==
Narasingha was the only son of Chandi Charan Malla Deb, the titular Raja.

== Work as Raja ==
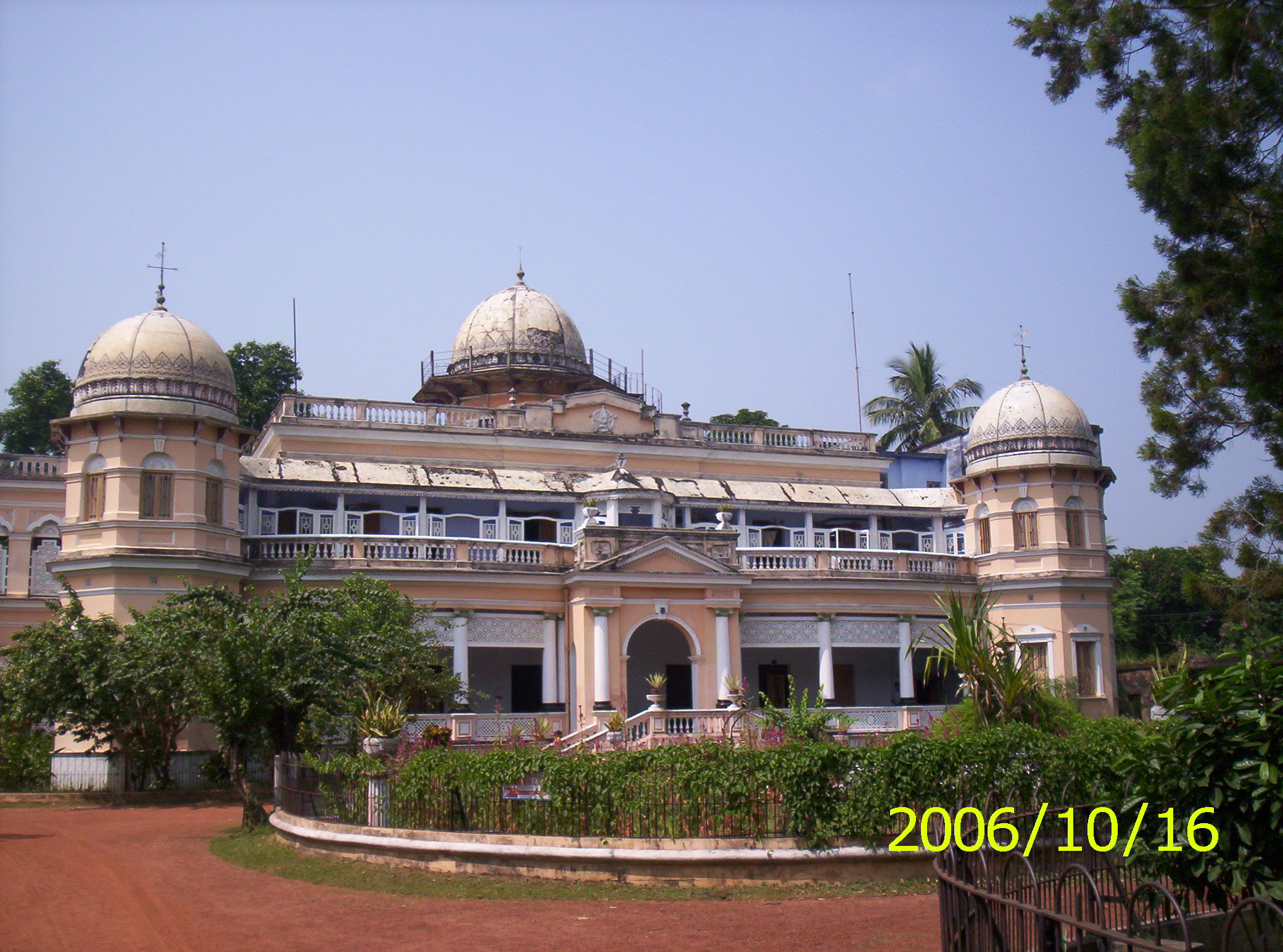
The Jhargram Palace

After losing his zamindari, Malla Deb served for two terms as a member of the Legislative Council of Bengal. He also served in the Lok Sabha, the lower house of the Indian Parliament.

== Honours ==
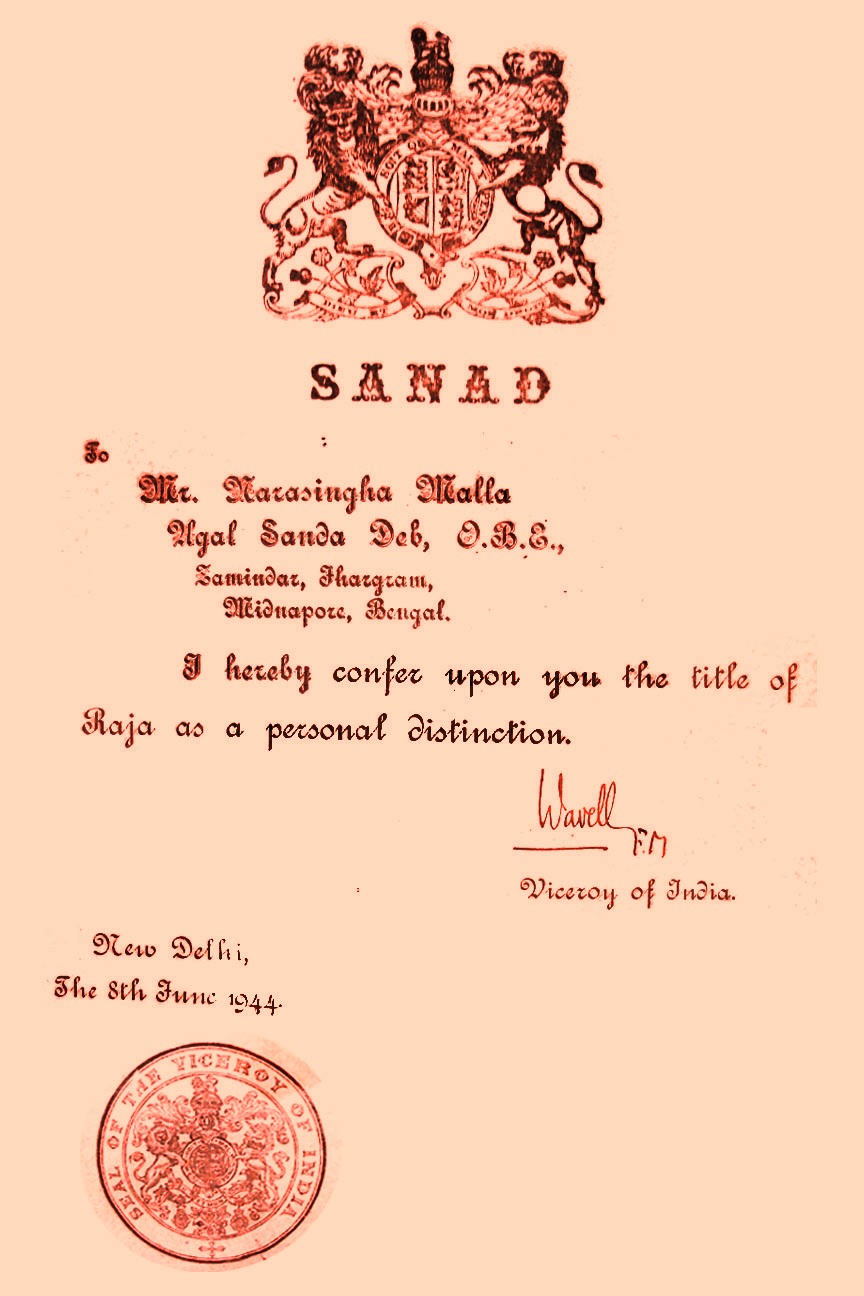
A Sanad (deed) issued by the Viceroy of India to Jhargram Raj

- King George V Silver Jubilee Medal
- Officer of The Most Excellent Order of the British Empire, bestowed on him by King George VI on 12 June 1941.
- Raja title, conferred upon him by Lord Wavell the Viceroy of India on 8 June 1944

== See also ==
- Jhargram Raj
- Jhargram Palace
