= Chando Likhon =

2001 film by Umesh Mardi

- Directed by: Dasrath Hansdah
- Written by: Umesh Marandi
- Produced by: Gangarani Thapa
- Starring: Prem Marandi; Aminshu Kisku; Anjali; Pushpa
- Cinematography: Sunil
- Edited by: Choice
- Music by: Chandan Baskey
- Production company: Gold Disc
- Release date: 2001
- Countries: Jharkhand, India
- Language: Santali

Chando Likhon is the first Santali film to be made on 35 mm released in 2001. Bengali film-maker prem Mardi and actress aminshu kisku, who earned acclaim for her performance in Chando Likhon, were jointly honoured with the AISFA special award.

== Cast ==
- Prem Mardi
- Aminshu Kisku
  - Camera - Dasrath Hansdah
  - Label - Gold Disc
  - Singer - Sawan Murmu, Geeta, Masang
  - Music - Chandan Baskey
