= Chunibala Hansda =

Indian politician

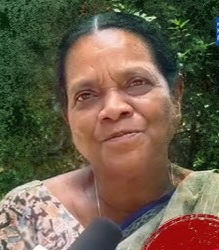

West Bengal Legislative Assembly
- In office 1 March 2000 – 13 May 2001
- Preceded by: Naren Hansda
- Succeeded by: Sambhu Nath Mandi
- Constituency: Binpur
- In office 11 May 2006 – 13 May 2011
- Preceded by: Sambhu Nath Mandi
- Succeeded by: Dibakar Hansda
- Constituency: Binpur

Personal details
- Party: Jharkhand Party (Naren)
- Spouse: Naren Hansda
- Children: Birbaha Hansda

Chunibala Hansda is an Indian politician from West Bengal and the president of Jharkhand Party (Naren).

== Biography ==
Hansda's husband Naren Hansda was a legislator of the West Bengal Legislative Assembly. Their daughter Birbaha Hansda is a former Santali film actress; as of 2025, she is a politician serving as Minister of State for Forests in the Government of West Bengal.

Hansda was elected as a member of the West Bengal Legislative Assembly from Binpur in 2000. Later, she was also elected from this constituency in 2006.
