= Khagendranath Hembram =

Member of the West Bengal Legislative Assembly
- In office 2016–2021
- Preceded by: Dibakar Hansda
- Succeeded by: Debnath Hansda
- Constituency: Binpur

Personal details
- Party: Trinamool Congress
- Profession: Politician

Khagendranath Hembram is an Indian politician from West Bengal. He was elected as a Member of the Legislative Assembly in 2016 West Bengal Legislative Assembly election from Binpur, as a member of the Trinamool Congress.
