= Uma Saren =

Indian politician (born 1984)

Member of Parliament, Lok Sabha
- In office 26 May 2014 – 23 May 2019
- Preceded by: Pulin Bihari Baske
- Succeeded by: Kunar Hembram
- Constituency: Jhargram

Personal details
- Born: 9 May 1984 (age 42) New Delhi, India
- Party: Trinamool Congress
- Education: Nil Ratan Sircar Medical College and Hospital (M.B.B.S.)
- Profession: Medical Practitioner

Uma Saren (born 9 May 1984) is an Indian politician who was elected as the Member of Lok Sabha for Jhargram in the 2014 general election. She belongs to Trinamool Congress. A medical practitioner by profession, she is the first person to speak in the Santali language in the Inter-Parliamentary Union.

== Early life ==
Saren was born on 9 May 1984. Her father worked with the Indian Railways as a Group D staff. She received a M.B.B.S. degree from Nil Ratan Sircar Medical College and Hospital in 2012. She belongs to the Santhal community.

== Political career ==
In 2012, Saren joined Junglemahal Bhoomiputra and Kanya Medical Association whose aim was to provide medical facilities in remote areas to the tribals in the Bengal-Jharkhand border.

On 5 May 2014, Trinamool Congress party announced that Saren would contest the general election from Jhargram constituency. She was pitted against Communist Party of India (Marxist) candidate Pulin Bihari Baske. In May, she was elected to the Lok Sabha and defeated Baske by a margin of 3,50,756 votes. She became the first ever woman Santhal MP of India. She also won with the highest margin in her state. In 2014, she was the member of two standing parliamentary committees: the Standing Committee on Chemicals and Fertilizers and the Consultative Committee on Ministry of Tribal Affairs.

In April 2017, Saren utilised ₹16.39 crore (US$1.7 million) from her MPLADS funds to buy ceiling fans, LED lamps and water coolers for 3,000 schools in the state.

On 28 May 2018, Saren became the first person to speak in the Santali language in the Inter-Parliamentary Union. She spoke about the many problems faced by various tribes in India. She was also the only woman in the Indian delegation which consisted of seven members.

On 12 March 2019, the party announced that they had not renominated Saren for the 2019 general election and her term ended on 20 May 2019. Partymen alleged that she did not use the MPLADS funds.
