= Lakshmi Kanta Sau =

Indian politician (born 1978)

Member of the West Bengal Legislative Assembly
- Incumbent
- Assumed office 4 May 2026
- Preceded by: Birbaha Hansda
- Constituency: Jhargram

Personal details
- Born: November 16, 1978 (age 48)
- Party: Bharatiya Janata Party
- Spouse: Pampa Sau
- Children: Swagato Sau
- Parent: Churamoni Sau
- Education: Utkal University (B.Sc in Zoology)
- Occupation: Business
- Profession: Politician

Lakshmi Kanta Sau (born 16 November 1978) is an Indian politician from West Bengal. He is a member of West Bengal Legislative Assembly from the Jhargram Assembly constituency in Jhargram district representing the Bharatiya Janata Party.

== Early life and education ==
Sau is from Nayagram, Jhargram district, West Bengal. He is the son of Churamoni Sau. He completed his BSc in zoology at a college affiliated with Utkal University In 1999. He and his wife run their own family business. He declared assets worth Rs.9 crore in his affidavit to the Election Commission of India.

== Career ==
Sau won the Jhargram Assembly constituency representing the Bharatiya Janata Party in the 2026 West Bengal Legislative Assembly election. He polled 1,20,877 votes and defeated his nearest rival, Mongal Saren of the All India Trinamool Congress, by a margin of 38,147 votes.

=== Electoral performance ===
West Bengal Legislative Assembly
Year	Constituency	Party	Votes	%	Opponent	Party	Votes	%	Margin	Result
2026	Jhargram	BJP	120,877	54.71	Mongal Saren	AITC	82,730	37.44	38,147	Won

== See also ==
- 2026 West Bengal Legislative Assembly election
- List of chief ministers of West Bengal
- West Bengal Legislative Assembly
