= Jharkhand Party (Naren) =

Political party in India

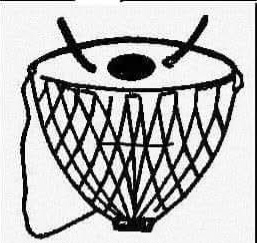
- Abbreviation: JKP(N)
- Leader: Chunibala Hansda
- Founder: Naren Hansda
- Split from: Jharkhand Party
- Headquarters: Jhagranpur, West Bengal
- Ideology: Indigenous rights; Regionalism
- Colours: Red
- ECI Status: registered unrecognized party
- Alliance: TMC+ (2011–2016, 2021-present); NDA (2006); UPA (2011–2016); Congress Alliance (1998–2001)

Jharkhand Party (Naren) was a regional political party in the Indian state of West Bengal. It was founded in the late 1990s by Naren Hansda, breaking away from the Jharkhand Party.

Naren Hansda served as a member of the West Bengal Legislative Assembly from Binpur from 1991 to 1999. His wife, Chunibala Hansda represented the same constituency from 2006 to 2011, and is currently the leader of JKP(N).

== History ==
Naren Hansda was elected as a member of the West Bengal Legislative Assembly as a Jharkhand Party candidate from Binpur in 1991. Later, he quit Jharkhand Party and founded Jharkhand Party (Naren). He was elected as a member of the West Bengal Legislative Assembly as a Jharkhand Party candidate from Binpur in 1996.

Hansda died on 25 June 1999.

Hansda's wife Chunibala Hansda is a former member of the West Bengal Legislative Assembly, and their daughter Birbaha Hansda is an Indian politician who currently serves as Cabinet Minister in the Government of West Bengal and is a former actress in Santali film industry.

Chunibala Hansda was elected as a member of the West Bengal Legislative Assembly from Binpur in 2000. Later, she was also elected from this constituency in 2006.

== Electoral history ==
=== Indian general elections ===
Election	Alliance	Seats contested	Seats won	Total votes	Vote %
1996	none	2	0	94,655	0.3%
1998	Congress Alliance	2	0	1,81,018	0.5%
1999	Congress Alliance	2	0	1,01,441	0.3%
2004	none	3	0	67,782	0.2%
2009	none	2	0	61,307	0.1%
2014	none	1	0	7,608	0%
2019	none	1	0	11,204	0%
2024	did not contest				

=== West Bengal Legislative Assembly ===
Assembly Election	Alliance	Seats contested	Seats won	Total votes	Votes %	Ref.
1996	none	8	1	1,45,503	0.4%	
2001	none	3	0	7,549	0.0%	
2006	NDA	4	1	1,01,490	0.3%	
2011	UPA	1	0	53,118	0.1%	
2016	none	2	0	51,099	0.1%	
2021	did not contest					
