= Amar Basu =

Indian politician (died 2019)

MLA of Jhargram Vidhan Sabha Constituency
- In office 2006–2011
- Preceded by: Mina Santani
- Succeeded by: Sukumar Hansda

Personal details
- Born: 1939 or 1940
- Died: 20 February 2019 (age 79)
- Party: Communist Party of India (Marxist)

Amar Basu was an Indian politician. He was elected as MLA of Jhargram Vidhan Sabha Constituency in West Bengal Legislative Assembly in 2006. He died on 20 February 2019 at the age of 79.
