= Jadunath Kisku =

Indian politician (1923–1985)

Member of the Indian Parliament for 6th Lok Sabha
- In office 1977–1980
- Preceded by: Amiya Kumar Kisku
- Succeeded by: Matilal Hansda
- Constituency: Jhargram, West Bengal

Personal details
- Born: 1 July 1923 Golasuli Village, Midnapore, Bengal Presidency, British India
- Died: 1985 (aged 64–65)
- Party: CPI(M)
- Spouse: Sarojini Kisku

Jadunath Kisku (1 July 1923 – 1985) was an Indian politician and a member of the Communist Party of India (Marxist) political party. He was elected to the Lok Sabha, lower house of the Parliament of India in 1977 from Jhargram constituency in West Bengal.
