= Sukumar Hansda =

Indian politician (died 2020)

Deputy Speaker of the West Bengal Legislative Assembly
- In office 28 December 2018 – 29 October 2020
- Governor: Keshari Nath Tripathi; Jagdeep Dhankhar
- Chief Minister: Mamata Banerjee
- Speaker: Biman Banerjee
- Preceded by: Haider Aziz Safwi
- Succeeded by: Asish Banerjee

Member of West Bengal Legislative Assembly
- In office 13 May 2011 – 29 October 2020
- Governor: M. K. Narayanan
- Preceded by: Amar Basu
- Constituency: Jhargram

Personal details
- Born: 1956/1957
- Died: 29 October 2020 (aged 63)
- Party: All India Trinamool Congress

Sukumar Hansda (1956/1957 – 29 October 2020) was an Indian politician who served as Minister for Paschimanchal Unnayan Affairs in the Government of West Bengal. He was also a MLA, elected from the Jhargram constituency in the 2011 West Bengal state assembly election. He also served as the Deputy Speaker of the West Bengal Legislative Assembly.

Sukumar Hansda died of prostate cancer, aged 63, on 29 October 2020, at a private hospital in Kolkata and tested positive for COVID-19.
