= Radhanagar =

Radhanagar may refer to:

- Radhanagar, Nadia in Nadia district of West Bengal, India
- Radhanagore (also spelt Radhanagar) in Hooghly District of West Bengal, India
- Radhanagar, Bankura in Bankura district, West Bengal, India
- Radhanagar, Sonarpur in West Bengal, India
- Radhanagar, Paschim Medinipur, a village in West Bengal, India
- Radhanagar, Sahibganj, a village in West Bengal, India
