= Binpur Assembly constituency =

Binpur
- Constituency No. 237 for the West Bengal Legislative Assembly
- Interactive Map Outlining Binpur Assembly Constituency

Constituency details
- Country: India
- Region: East India
- State: West Bengal
- District: Jhargram
- Lok Sabha constituency: Jhargram
- Established: 1951
- Total electors: 179,732
- Reservation: ST

Member of Legislative Assembly
- 18th West Bengal Legislative Assembly
- Incumbent Pranat Tudu
- Party: BJP
- Elected year: 2026
- Preceded by: Debnath Hansda

Binpur is an assembly constituency in Jhargram district in the Indian state of West Bengal. It is reserved for scheduled tribes.

== Overview ==
As per orders of the Delimitation Commission, No. 237 Binpur Assembly constituency (ST) is composed of the following: Binpur II and Jamboni CD Block.

Binpur Assembly constituency is part of No. 33 Jhargram (Lok Sabha constituency).

== Members of the Legislative Assembly ==
Year	Name	Party
1951	Mangal Chandra Saren	Indian National Congress
1951	Nripendra Gopal Mitra	Indian National Congress
1957	Sudhir Kumar Pandey	Communist Party of India
1957	Jamadar Hansda	Communist Party of India
1962	Mangal Chandra Saren	Indian National Congress
1967	Mangal Chandra Saren	Indian National Congress
1969	Joyram Soren	Communist Party of India
1971	Shyam Charan Murmu	Jharkhand Party
1972	Joyram Soren	Communist Party of India
1977	Sambhu Nath Mandi	Communist Party of India (Marxist)
1982	Sambhu Nath Mandi	Communist Party of India (Marxist)
1987	Durga Tudu	Communist Party of India (Marxist)
1991	Naren Hansda	Jharkhand Party (Naren)
1996	Naren Hansda	Jharkhand Party (Naren)
2001	Sambhu Nath Mandi	Communist Party of India (Marxist)
2006	Chunibala Hansda	Jharkhand Party (Naren)
2011	Dibakar Hansda	Communist Party of India (Marxist)
2016	Khagendranath Hembram	All India Trinamool Congress
2021	Debnath Hansda	All India Trinamool Congress
2026	Pranat Tudu	Bharatiya Janata Party

== Election results ==
=== 2026 ===
2026 West Bengal Legislative Assembly election: Binpur
Party	Candidate	Votes	%	±%
BJP	Pranat Tudu	107,238	51.54	▲19.35
AITC	Birbaha Hansda	84,261	40.49	▼12.62
CPI(M)	Rabindranath Sardar	5,619	2.7	▼1.72
INC	Golapi Saren	2,040	0.98	New entry
BSP	Bholanath Sardar	1908	0.92	▼0.95
NOTA	None of the above	2,679	1.29	▼0.46
Majority		22,977	11.05	▼9.87
Turnout		208,079	93.93	▲9.66
BJP gain from AITC		Swing		

=== 2021 ===
2021 West Bengal Legislative Assembly election: Binpur
Party	Candidate	Votes	%	±%
AITC	Debnath Hansda	100,277	53.11	
BJP	Palan Soren	60,783	32.19	
CPI(M)	Dibakar Hansda	8,353	4.42	
Independent	Nityalal Sing	6,318	3.35	
BSP	Patal Chandra Murmu	3,530	1.87	
Independent	Bablu Murmu	2,685	1.42	
Independent	Mangal Chandra Sardar	1,815	0.96	
SUCI(C)	Rajib Mudi	1,732	0.92	
NOTA	None of the above	3,305	1.75	
Majority		39,494	20.92	
Turnout		188,798	84.27	
AITC hold		Swing		

=== 2016 ===
West Bengal assembly elections, 2016: Binpur (ST) constituency
Party	Candidate	Votes	%	±%
AITC	Khagendranath Hembram	95,804	55.07	
CPI(M)	Dibakar Hansda	46,481	26.72	−14.45
BJP	Murari Mohan Baske	15,467	8.89	+3.61
Jharkhand Party	Birbaha Hansda	7,094	4.08	−31.93
NOTA	None of the above	5,158	2.97	
AJSU	Subodh Saren	2,250	1.29	
SUCI(C)	Rajib Mudi	1,701	0.98	
Turnout		173,955	84.43	+2.35
AITC gain from CPI(M)		Swing		

=== 2011 ===
West Bengal assembly elections, 2011: Binpur (ST) constituency
Party	Candidate	Votes	%	±%
CPI(M)	Dibakar Hansda	60,728	41.17	−0.51
Jharkhand Party	Chunibala Hansda	53,128	36.01	−9.86
Independent	Arjun Hansda	14,459	9.80	
Independent	Sukumar Hembram	8,715	5.91	
BJP	Panchanan Hansda	7,793	5.28	
AMB	Rampada Hansda	2,705		
Turnout		147,518	82.08	
CPI(M) gain from Jharkhand Party		Swing	9.35	

=== 2006 ===
In 2006 state assembly elections, Chunibala Hansda of Jharkhand Party (Naren) won the Binpur (ST) assembly seat defeating her nearest rival Sambhu Nath Mandi of CPI(M). Contests in most years were multi cornered but only winners and runners are being mentioned. Sambhu Nath Mandi of CPI(M) defeated Chunibala Hansda of Jharkhand Party (Naren)/ Independent in 2001. Naren Hansda of Jharkhand Party (Naren) defeated Durga Tudu of CPI(M) in 1996 and 1991. Durga Tudu of CPI(M) defeated Panchanan Hansda of Congress in 1987. Sambhu Nath Mandi of CPI(M) defeated Naren Hansda, Independent, in 1982 and Dakhin Murmu of Janata Party in 1977.

=== 1972 ===
Joyram Soren of CPI won in 1972. Shyam Charan Murmu of Jharkhand Party won in 1971. Joyram Soren of CPI won in 1969. Mangal Chandra Saren of Congress won in 1967 and 1962. Sudhir Kumar Pandey and Jamadar Hansda, both of CPI, won in 1957. In independent India's first election in 1951, Mangal Chandra Saren and Nripendra Gopal Mitra, both of Congress, won the Binpur dual seat.
