= Pranat Tudu =

Indian politician

Member of the West Bengal Legislative Assembly
- Incumbent
- Assumed office 2026
- Preceded by: Debnath Hansda
- Constituency: Binpur

Personal details
- Party: Bharatiya Janata Party
- Profession: Politician

Pranat Tudu is an Indian politician and member of the Bharatiya Janata Party. He was elected as a Member of the West Bengal Legislative Assembly from the Binpur (ST) constituency in the 2026 West Bengal Legislative Assembly election.
