= Rupchand Murmu =

Indian politician

Member of the Indian Parliament for 10th, 11th, 12th, 13th and 14th Lok Sabha
- In office 1991–2009
- Preceded by: Matilal Hansda
- Constituency: Jhargram

Personal details
- Born: 3 November 1947 (age 78) Midnapore, West Bengal
- Party: CPI(M)
- Spouse: Sumitra Murmu
- Children: 3 daughters
- As of 17 September, 2006

Rupchand Murmu (born 3 November 1947) is an Indian politician and a member of the Communist Party of India (Marxist) political party. He was elected to the 10th Lok Sabha in 1991 from Jhargram constituency in West Bengal. He was re-elected to the Lok Sabha in 1996, 1998, 1999 and 2004 from the same constituency.
