= Santali cinema =

Santali-language film industry

Cinema of Jharkhand
- No. of screens: 2 (2007)
  - Per capita: 0.1 per 100,000 (2007)

Produced feature films (2014)
- Total: 110

Gross box office (2010)
- Total: ₹150 million

Santali cinema, also known as Sollywood, has its presence in the Indian states of Jharkhand and Orissa, and parts of Nepal (especially Jhapa District and Morang District), where Santals live. Santali films are made in the Santali language.

== History ==
The history of Santali cinema seems to be little unknown or disputed. Before 2000, most of the Santali films were simultaneously or partially re-shot with Bengali films. Or many Bengali films were dubbed and released in Santali, which continue to this day. The chapter of Santali cinema began in the 1980s, when few Santali films were commercially successful at regional level. While Santali cinema may not have gained mainstream popularity compared to other regional film industries in India, it plays a significant role in representing and preserving the cultural diversity of the Santali community. The industry continues to evolve, and with increasing access to technology and platforms, Santali filmmakers have more opportunities to reach a wider audience and promote their unique stories and perspectives.

Santali cinema has not been able to create an identity as a film industry like most other cinemas in India. Every year about 8 to 10 films are made and released directly, on CDs only. None of them are released in cinema halls, due to low budget and minimal support from state government in development of the cinema. Music albums are preferred over video films, as the budget is very low and production cost is easily recovered. The number of these ranges from 10 to 20.

Santali cinema has a good scope in the states of Jharkhand and Odisha the majority of its viewers reside in these regions. Although some initiatives have been taken to support Santali cinema, allowing it to prosper, only three films managed to make it to the big screen as of 2013: Chando Likhon, which was released in 2001, was the first film to be made on 35 mm movie film; second in this series was Sagun Ena Sohag Dular (2003), which was loosely based on the 1982 Bollywood film Nadiya Ke Paar; Jewee Jurie (Life Partner) (2009) was produced by SBT Movie Craft and released widely in the states of Jharkhand, Odisha, and others. Bonodal (The Change) (2016), Nepal's first historic Santali feature film, was produced and directed by Kiran Khatiwada.

In 2008, first international platform for Santali films was launched in Jamshedpur by Dashrath Hansda. On the same year, RASCA launched a website. As there is no film development corporation in Jharkhand, the Santali film industry is in an unremarkable position, and due to this, films and music albums are made less in number and distributed inefficiently, due to cost and other reasons. In Jharkhand, Dhanbad, Jamshedpur and their surroundings, don't have proper cinema halls and ticket prices are very low compared to multiplexes all over India. So releasing a film in cinema halls is not very profitable.

== Notable personalities ==
- Birbaha Hansda, actress and politician
- Rathin Kisku, singer and lyricist
- Monika Mundu, playback singer

== Films ==
- Sondhayni (2019) – directed by Seral Murmu
- Raawah (2017) – directed by Seral Murmu
- Godom Hadam Cycle (2019) – directed by Mansingh Baskey
- Dare oka ko seno kan? (where do the trees go? ) (2025) directed by Mansingh Baskey
- Chando Likhon (The Script Of God) (2001) – first film to be made on 35 mm film
- Hai Re Aree Chali (Alas! Our Customs) (2004)
- Jewee Jurie (2009)
- Sita Nala Re Sagun Supari – screened at the second edition of Nepal International Indigenous Film Festival, 2008
- Poran Porayni
- Bir Manani
- Sabarnaka Surubali (2018)
- Karo Kuili (2018)
- Mogod Dulaar (Love Unexpressed) (2009)
- Aamge Sari Dulariya (2012)
- Bardu (2014)
- Sagai (2014) – directed by Raj Lakhan
- Suluk (2013)
- Arjun (2019) – directed by Reema Noopur
- Arjun Part-2 (Upcoming Santali FIlm) (2026) – Directed By Ramesh Bogati Produced By Kundan Kr. Yadav
- Sona Miru (2022)
- Bonodal (The Change) (2016) – directed and produced by Kiran Khatiwada; Nepal's first historic Santali feature film
- Kiryo (2012) – directed by Sibaji Baskey
