= Jhargram Assembly constituency =

Jhargram
- Constituency No. 222 for the West Bengal Legislative Assembly
- Interactive Map Outlining Jhargram Assembly Constituency

Constituency details
- Country: India
- Region: East India
- State: West Bengal
- District: Jhargram
- Lok Sabha constituency: Jhargram
- Established: 1957
- Total electors: 184,109
- Reservation: None

Member of Legislative Assembly
- 18th West Bengal Legislative Assembly
- Incumbent Lakshmi Kanta Sau
- Party: BJP
- Alliance: NDA
- Elected year: 2026

Jhargram Assembly constituency is an assembly constituency in Jhargram district in the Indian state of West Bengal.

== Overview ==
As per orders of the Delimitation Commission, No. 222 Jhargram Assembly constituency is composed of the following: Jhargram municipality, Bandhgora, Manikpara, Radhanagar and Sapdhara gram panchayats of Jhargram community development block and Binpur I community development block.

Jhargram Assembly constituency is part of No. 33 Jhargram (Lok Sabha constituency) (ST).

== Members of the Legislative Assembly ==
Year	Name	Party
1957	Mahendra Nath Mahata	Indian National Congress
1962	Mahendra Nath Mahata	Indian National Congress
1967	Prafulla Chandra Ghosh	Independent politician
1969	Panchkari De	Bangla Congress
1971	Birendra Bijay Malladeb	Indian National Congress
1972	Birendra Bijay Malladeb	Indian National Congress
1977	Ramchandra Satpati	Independent politician
1982	Abani Bhusan Satpathi	Communist Party of India
1987	Abani Bhusan Satpathi	Communist Party of India
1991	Buddadeb Bhakat	Communist Party of India
1996	Buddadeb Bhakat	Communist Party of India
2001	Mina Sanatani	Communist Party of India
2006	Amar Basu	Communist Party of India
2011	Sukumar Hansda	Trinamool Congress
2016	Sukumar Hansda	Trinamool Congress
2021	Birbaha Hansda	Trinamool Congress
2026	Lakshmi Kanta Sau	Bharatiya Janata Party

== Election results ==
=== 2026 ===
2026 West Bengal Legislative Assembly election: Jhargram
Party	Candidate	Votes	%	±%
BJP	Lakshmi Kanta Sau	120,877	54.71	+19.4
AITC	Mongal Saren	82,730	37.44	−16.82
CPI(M)	Arjun Kumar Mahato	6,604	2.99	−2.18
INC	Prasenjit De	1,506	0.69	
NOTA	None of the above	2,262	1.02	−0.78
Majority		38,147	17.27	−1.68
Turnout		220,940	93.78	+8.29
BJP gain from AITC		Swing		

=== 2021 ===
2021 West Bengal Legislative Assembly election: Jhargram
Party	Candidate	Votes	%	±%
AITC	Birbaha Hansda	109,493	54.26	
BJP	Sukhamoy Satpathy	71,253	35.31	
CPI(M)	Madhuja Sen Roy	10,430	5.17	
NOTA	None of the above	3,636	1.8	
Majority		38,240	18.95	
Turnout		201,797	85.49	
AITC hold		Swing		

=== 2016 ===
2016 West Bengal Legislative Assembly election: Jhargram
Party	Candidate	Votes	%	±%
AITC	Sukumar Hansda	99,233	55.00	+10.33
Jharkhand Party	Chunibala Hansda	44,005	24.00	new
BJP	Ajay Kumar Sen	18,843	11.11	+7.00
INC	Subrata Bhattacharya	7,017		
SUCI(C)	Mahadeb Pratihar	2,343		
AJSU	Gunadhar Mahato	1,599		
Turnout				
AITC hold		Swing		

=== 2011 ===
West Bengal assembly elections, 2011: Jhargram
Party	Candidate	Votes	%	±%
AITC	Sukumar Hansda	69,464	44.67	+4.32#
CPI(M)	Amar Basu	54,191	34.85	−19.97
Independent	Chhatradhar Mahata	20,037	12.88	
BJP	Bijay Mahato	6,376	4.10	
JMM	Sunil Kisku	5,573	3.66	
Jharkhand Anushilan Party	Bholanath Mahata	5,452	3.51	
Turnout		155,520	84.47	
AITC gain from CPI(M)		Swing	24.29#	

.# Swing calculated on Congress+Trinamool Congress vote percentages taken together in 2006.

=== 2006 ===
In the 2006 state assembly elections, Amar Basu of CPI(M) won the Jhargram assembly seat defeating his nearest rival Shivendra Bijoy Malladeb of Congress. Contests in most years were multi cornered but only winners and runners are being mentioned. Mina Sanatani of CPI(M) defeated Makhan Lal Bangal of Trinamool Congress in 2001. Buddhadeb Bhakat of CPI(M) defeated Chaitanya Murmu of Congress in 1996 and Nikhil Maiti of Congress in 1991. Abani Bhusan Satpathi of CPI(M) defeated Bhabesh Mahata of Congress in 1987 and Birendra Bijoy Malladeb of Congress in 1982. Ram Chandra Satpathy of CPI(M) defeated Birendra Bijoy Malladeb of Congress in 1977.

=== 1972 ===
Birendra Bijoy Malladeb of Congress won in 1972 and 1971. Panchkari De of Bangla Congress won in 1969. P.C.Ghosh, Independent, won in 1967. Mahendra Nath Mahata of Congress won in 1962 and 1957.
