= Jhargram =

- City
- Location in West Bengal, India Jhargram (India)
- Coordinates: 22.45°N 86.98°E
- Country: India
- State: West Bengal
- District: Jhargram

Government
  - Type: Municipality
  - Body: Jhargram Municipality

Area
  - Total: 21.40 km^{2} (8.26 sq mi)
- Elevation: 81 m (266 ft)

Population (2011)
  - Total: 61,682
  - Density: 2,882/km^{2} (7,465/sq mi)

Languages
  - Official: Bengali, English
  - Major local language: Santali, Mundari, Kudmali
- Time zone: UTC+5:30 (IST)
- PIN: 721507
- Telephone code: 03221
- Vehicle registration: WB-49,50 (previously 33,34)
- Lok Sabha constituency: Jhargram
- Vidhan Sabha constituency: Jhargram
- Website: www.jhargrammunicipality.org

Jhargram (Bengali pronunciation: [d͡ʒʱaɽɡram]) is a city and a municipality in the Indian state of West Bengal. It is the headquarters of the Jhargram district. It is a popular tourist destination known for its dense forests, ancient temples and royal palaces.

== Geography ==
Cities and towns in Jhargram subdivision of Jhargram district
CT: census town, R: rural/ urban centre, H: historical/ religious centre
Owing to space constraints in the small map, the actual locations in a larger map may vary slightly

=== Location ===
Jhargram is located at 22.45°N 86.98°E. It has an average elevation of 81 metres (265 feet). The weather, like much of Bengal, is extremely humid and tropical. Temperatures can reach as high as 46 °C in the hot and dry months of May and June but can plummet to 4 °C in the chilly nights of December and January.

Note: The map alongside presents some of the notable locations in the subdivision. All places marked in the map are linked in the larger full screen map.

== History ==
Legend says that around 1592 CE, Man Singh of Amber had come to conquer Bengal on behest of Mughal Emperor Akbar from Rajputana (Rajasthan) to expand the Mughal Empire to Eastern India. He appointed one of his loyal officers in the army, Sarveshwar Singh, to defeat the local rulers of the region known as Junglekhand. This area is also mentioned in Ain-i-Akbari as Jhari-khanda, and it was populated by the Santhal, Munda, Bhumij, Kudmi Mahato and Lodha people groups. The area belonged to the Mal Raja.

The first fortress was supposed to have existed in Old Jhargram, but the ruins of the fortress are said to have gone underground due to some unknown reasons. The name of state capital, Jhargram, means a forest village which is surrounded by walls and canals. It was known as Ugal in the local language. Even today, the day after Durga Ashtami, the four corners (Ugals) are worshiped for the protection of the erstwhile kingdom. The man who was the hero or bull within the surrounded wall and canal were called Ugal Sanda. As such, the full name of the Raja of the State was known as Raja Sarveshwar Malla Ugal Sanda Deb, and the title has been continued up to Raja Narasingha Malla Ugal Sanda Deb.

During the Maratha invasion of Bengal between 1741 and 1751, the king of Jhargram Raja Man Govind Malla Dev joined his armed forces with the Raja of Bishnupur and the Nawab of Bengal to fight a war against them, and they were victorious. Jhargram remained an independent kingdom until 1767, when The East India Company, led by Robert Clive, came from Midnapore, via Radhanagar to capture the Jhargram fort. Raja Shyam Sundar Malla Dev the then king of Jhargram worked on to check the advances of the British by allying with the Raja of Dhalbhumgarh, he took part in the Chuar Rebellion to protect his independent status. He defeated Colonel Fergusson at Dudhkundi near Kharagpur in 1791 when the East India Company tried to enter Jhargram. Fergusson's forces, consisting of 100 Europeans, 300 cavalry, 1400 sepoys and 10 field pieces, was the standard size of the colonial armies. But the second time the joint forces were defeated at Radhanagar by the British army in 1793, ending thereby the last hurdle to the colonial conquest of Bengal, hence the treaty of Midnapore confirmed the surrender of Jhargram and Dhalbhum to the British. But soon the British Governor of Bengal endorsed his stature, the kingdom was then recognized as a Zamindari estate under the law of primogeniture, and the ruler was given the title of Raja. Jhargram fell twice into the Court of Wards, after the death of Raja Raghunath Malla Ugal Sanda Deb and Raja Chandi Charan Malla Ugal Sanda Deb, respectively; but was later released when the Raja Narasingha Malla Deb attained majority. In this connection, it may be mentioned that in 1944–45, the then Vice-Roy of India agreed to recognize Jhargram as a feudatory state; but at that time, the whole of India was going through turmoil and was moving towards independence. The Cabinet mission came to negotiate with congress, the Muslim League, and other parties. The proposal for the feudatory status of Jhargram Raj has put aside then.

The rulers of Jhargram were benevolent and progressive, and they focused on the welfare of their subjects. Raja Raghunath Malla Deb studied FA in Scottish Church College, and was the first-degree holder in the district. In 1899, he had established the first primary school in his kingdom. Raja was also an avid wrestler and was known for miraculous physical strength. His wrestling instruments are still kept in the Palace and Calcutta Museum. Raja Sir Narasingha Malla Deb, the last titular king of Jhargram, is considered the father of modern Jhargram. Educated at Midnapore Collegiate School and Presidency College in Calcutta, he is conferred with OBE and KBE, granted the King George V Silver Jubilee Medal, served as a member of the Legislative Council of Bengal from 1947 to 1952 and 1952–57, and also a member of Parliament-Lok Sabha in Congress from 1957 to 1962. He commissioned the new palace in 1931, which is one of the finest example of Indo Saracenic architecture and spread over 23 acres of land. During World War II, Raja sahib constructed an airstrip in Dudhkundi for the United States Air Force, apart also provided the Allied forces with elephants, vehicles and other help.

Between 1922 and 1950 Prof. Debendra Mohan Battacharya was the administrator of Jhargram and that time is seen as a golden age. In those twenty-eight years, Jhargram developed into a township; and during this period, many educational institutions were established and developed. Kumud Kumari Institution (K.K.I), a premier institution of the sub-division, was founded in 1924. In 1925, an annual sports fund was created; which was to be used to encourage sports activities, and construct the football stadium and the Jhargram Club. Raja Narasingha Malla Deb established Jhargram Agricultural College, which was renamed Jhargram Raj College. He also established Vidyasagar Polytechnic, industrial training and gave funds to set up Sri Ramkrishna Saradapeeth Girls High School and Bharat Sevashram Sangha. The royal family established and assisted in the running of all primary institutions for at risk people in the Jhargram estate. At the consent of the Governor of Bengal, he established a hospital at Jhargram town in the name of his late father, Chandi Charan Charitable Hospital. Later on in every tehsil, a charitable hospital was established for primary treatment in the nearby villages. Raja established the Bani Bhaban, under the guidance of Lady Abala Bose, for rehabilitation of widows. He also donated land to the Roman Catholic Church of India and the Muslim community to build Nurrani Jama Masjid in Jhargram. In 1947, further land was acquired, and Jhargram Raj constructed buildings to develop a school, which was Rani Binode Manjuri Govt. Girls School; which is now one of the premier schools in Midnapore district.

Between 1928 and 1950, Sir Raja Narasingha Malla Deb donated to welfare causes and donated 10,000 bighas of land to poor farmers in 1947, making him the single largest land donor in West Bengal.

In 2020, after a 9-year decline, Maoist insurgents returned to Jhargram and experienced a major resurgence, with some speculating an imminent Maoist resurgence in West Bengal.

Now there is a powerful gangster is Subhadip (mental) .

== Demographics ==
Historical population
Year	Pop.	±%
1951	7,975	—
1961	13,965	+75.1%
1971	19,237	+37.8%
1981	26,707	+38.8%
1991		—
2001		—
2011	61,712	—
Source: Census of India

Languages spoken in Jhargram (2011)
1. Bengali (89.2%)
2. Santali (7.08%)
3. Hindi (3.03%)
4. Others (0.68%)

As of 2011 India census, Jhargram had a population of 61,712. Males constitute 50% of the population and females 50%. Jhargram has an average literacy rate of 88.53%, higher than the national average of 76.26%: male literacy is 92.59%, and female literacy is 84.46%. In Jhargram, 8.72% of the population is under 6 years of age.

Religions in Jhargram
Religion	Percent
Hindus	94.72%
Muslims	1.66%
Christians	0.75%
Others	2.53%

Schedule Tribe (ST) constitutes 9.85% while Schedule Caste (SC) were 9.59% of total population in Jhargram.

== Police station ==
Jhargram District Police Station has jurisdiction over Jhargram CD Block.

== Economy ==
The main economy of this area is business & cultivation with tourism. Some people are government employees, school teachers or employed in other private sectors. The financial status of most of the people is in the middle class category.

== Education ==
=== General degree colleges ===
Jhargram Raj College

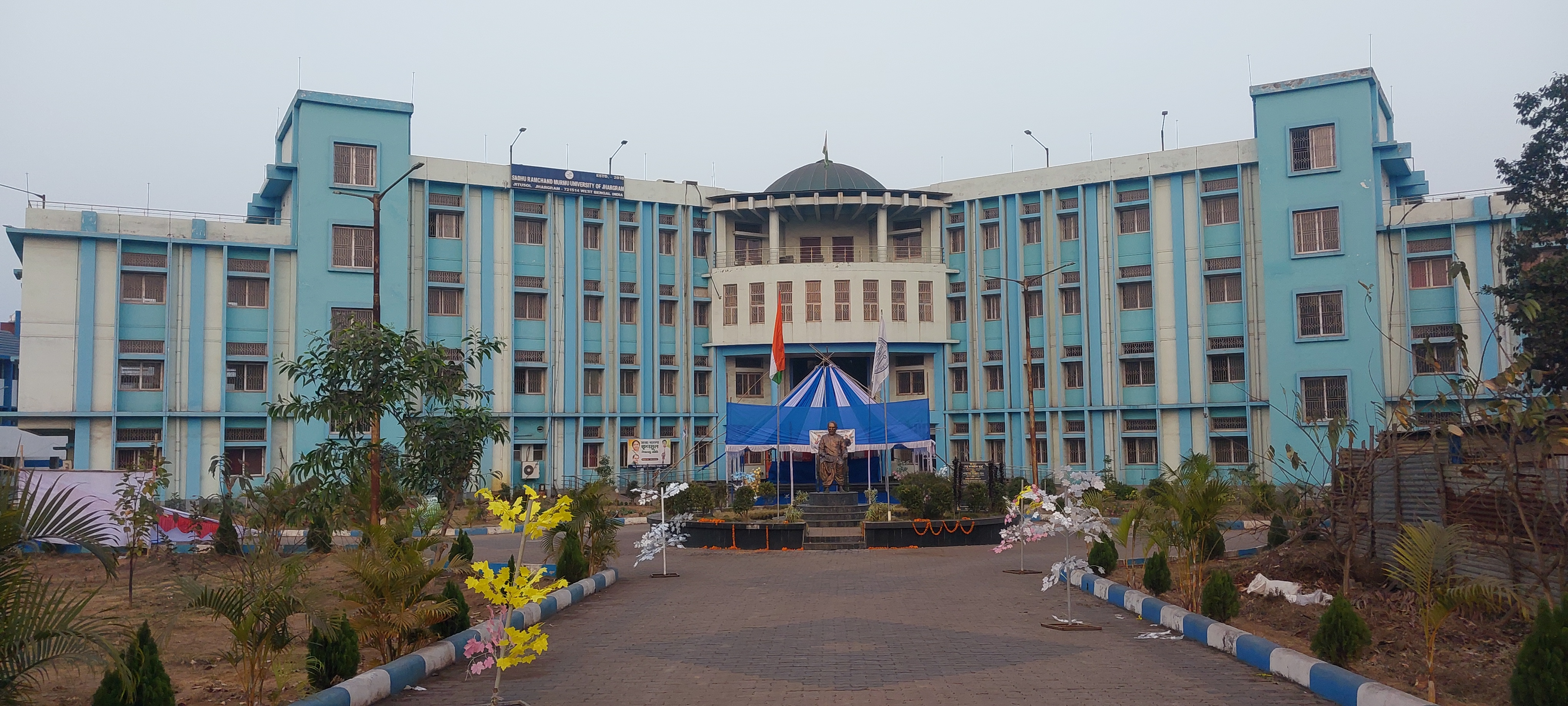
Sadhu Ram Chand Murmu University

- Sadhu Ram Chand Murmu University, Jitusol, Jhargram
- Jhargram Government Medical College and Hospital, Jhargram, WBUHS.NMC
- Government General Degree College, Gopiballavpur-II,Beliaberah, Jhargram District, Vidyasagar University
- Jhargram Raj College, (Govt. College) under Vidyasagar University
- Rani Indira Debi Government Girls' College (Govt. College) under Vidyasagar University

== Health ==
Jhargram District Hospital and Jhargram Super Specialty Hospital are main public sector hospitals in Jhargram. A number of private clinics and nursing homes also operate.

== Culture ==
Jhargram has many tribal dances, with some on the verge of extinction. Chuang, Chang, Chhou, Dangrey, Jhumair, Panta, Ranpa, Saharul, Tusu & Bhadu are examples of some of the tribal dances located here.

Besides the tribal culture, the regular Bengali festivals like Durga puja, Saraswati puja, Diwali and Kali pujas are well attended. Other common pujas in the worship of Shitala, Jagaddhatri, Holi, Ratha Yatra, Janmashtami, Bheema Puja, etc. also takes place.

A lot of fairs and carnivals take place in Jhargram. The famous fairs in Jhargram are Jungle Mahal Utsav, Jhargram Mela & Yuva Utsav, Rong Maati Manush, Shrabani Mela, Baishakhi Mela, Milan Mela.

== Transportation ==
=== Air ===
The nearest international airport is Netaji Subhash Chandra Bose International Airport of Kolkata 155 km (by train) and 169 km (by road — NH 6). Sonari Airport of Jamshedpur is located at a distance 96 km by train. Birsa Munda Airport of Ranchi is located at a distance of 233 km (by road — NH 33) and 258 km (by train).

=== Train ===
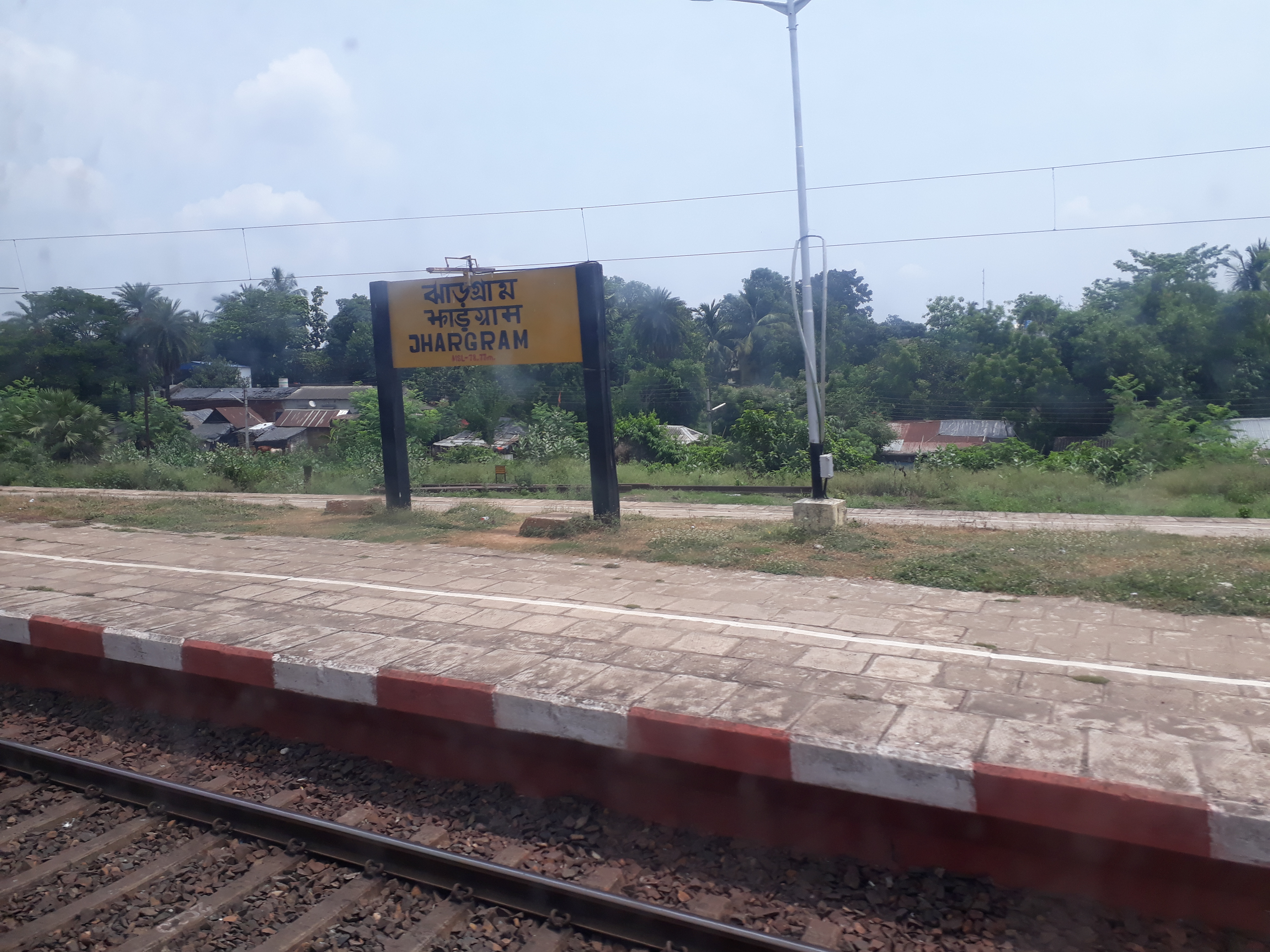
Jhargram railway station

Jhargram is connected not only to larger cities in the region, but also to smaller towns and villages in the district. Jhargram railway station is on the Kharagpur-Tatanagar section of Howrah-Nagpur-Mumbai line, an express train route. The Jhargram railway station comes under South Eastern Railway. Jhargram is well connected by train to nearest big city like Kolkata/Howrah (155 km), Midnapore (52 km), Kharagpur (39 km), Asansol, Tatanagar (96 km), Ranchi, Dhanbad, Rourkela, Jharsuguda, Bhubaneswar, Cuttack,Khurda, Puri, Bhilai and also Delhi, Mumbai etc.

=== Road ===
Jhargram is also very well connected by highways it lies on AH46 which is a part of the Asian Highway Network and also with other nearby cities like Medinipur (40 km over Dherua - Medinipur Road), Kharagpur (46 km over NH-6), Durgapur (156 km over SH-9), Asansol (181 km over NH-60 and SH-9), Bankura (114 km over SH-9 and 5), Purulia (142 km over SH-5), Haldia (150 km over AH46 and NH41), Contai (144 km over SH-5), Digha (165 km over NH-60), Kolkata/Howrah (169 km over AH46), Tatanagar (114 km over NH-33), Baripada (99 km over AH46 and NH-5),

=== Local transportation ===
For local transportation buses, taxis, minibuses, auto rickshaws, cycle rickshaws, and electric rickshaws are available.

== Notable people ==
- Byomkes Chakrabarti
- Narasingha Malla Deb
- Ruby Hembram
- Nitish Sengupta
- Jaydeep Sarangi
- Kherwal Soren
- Suryakant Tripathi
- Rocky Rupkumar Patra, a renowned film actor and director.
- Rajkumar Patra, a renowned Bengali film actor and producer.

== Gallery ==
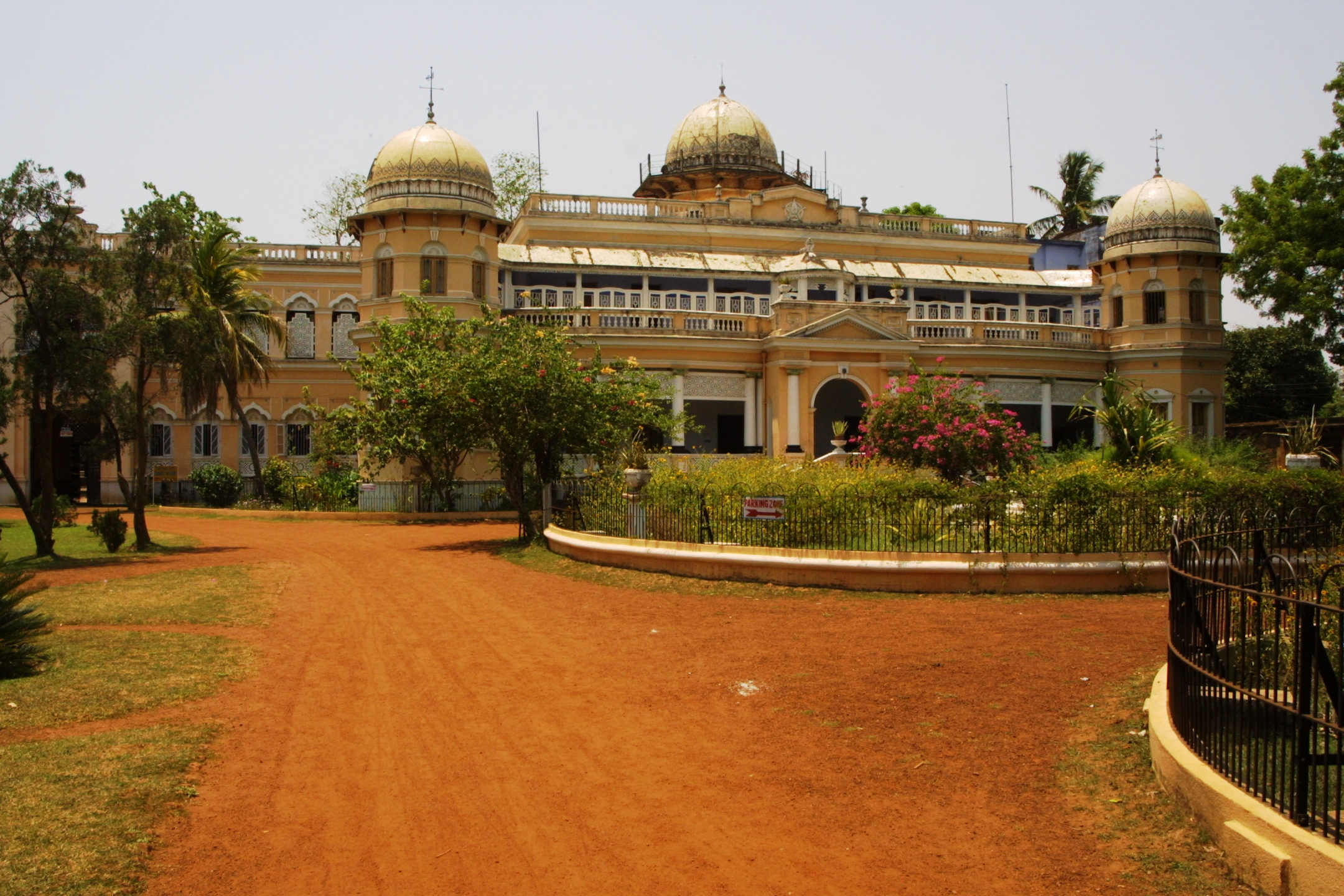
Jhargram Palace

Jhargram SDO Office

Circuit House, Jhargram

Jhargram District and Sessions Court

Junglemahal Zoological Park

Jhargram railway station New building

Bandarvula Tribal museum, Jhargram
