= Jhargram Lok Sabha constituency =

Lok Sabha Constituency in West Bengal

Coordinates: 22.45°N 87.00°E

Jhargram WB-33
- Lok Sabha constituency
- Interactive Map Outlining Jhargram Lok Sabha Constituency

Constituency details
- Country: India
- Region: East India
- State: West Bengal
- Assembly constituencies: Nayagram; Gopiballavpur; Jhargram; Garhbeta; Salboni; Binpur; Bandwan
- Established: 1962
- Total electors: 17,79,794 (2024)
- Reservation: ST

Member of Parliament
- 18th Lok Sabha
- Incumbent Kalipada Soren
- Party: NCPI
- Alliance: NDA
- Elected year: 2024

Jhargram Lok Sabha constituency is one of the 543 constituencies of the lower house of parliament in India.

The constituency centres on Jhargram in West Bengal. The seat is reserved for scheduled tribes. Four of the seven assembly segments of No. 33 Jhargram Lok Sabha constituency are in Jhargram district, two in Paschim Medinipur district and one assembly segment is in Purulia district.

== Assembly segments ==
Parliamentary constituencies in West Bengal - 1. Cooch Behar, 2. Alipurduars, 3. Jalpaiguri, 4. Darjeeling, 5. Raiganj, 6. Balurghat, 7. Maldaha Uttar, 8. Maldaha Dakshin, 9. Jangipur, 10. Baharampur, 11. Murshidabad, 12. Krishnanagar, 13. Ranaghat, 14. Bangaon, 15. Barrackpore, 16. Dum Dum, 17. Barasat, 18. Basirhat, 19. Jaynagar, 20. Mathurapur, 21. Diamond Harbour, 22. Jadavpur, 23. Kolkata Dakshin, 24. Kolkata Uttar, 25. Howrah, 26. Uluberia, 27. Serampore, 28. Hooghly, 29. Arambagh, 30. Tamluk, 31, Kanthi, 32. Ghatal, 33. Jhargram, 34. Medinipur, 35. Purulia, 36. Bankura, 37. Bishnupur, 38. Bardhaman Purba, 39. Bardhaman Durgapur, 40. Asansol, 41. Bolpur, 42. Birbhum

As per order of the Delimitation Commission issued in 2006 in respect of the delimitation of constituencies in the West Bengal, parliamentary constituency no. 33 Jhargram, reserved for Scheduled tribes (ST), is composed of the following segments:

#	Name	District	MLA, from 2026	MLA's Party	2024 Lok Sabha Lead
220	Nayagram (ST)	Jhargram	Amiya Kisku	BJP	AITC
221	Gopiballavpur	Jhargram	Rajesh Mahata	BJP	AITC
222	Jhargram	Jhargram	Lakshmi Kanta Sau	BJP	AITC
233	Garbeta	Paschim Medinipur	Pradip Lodha	BJP	AITC
234	Salboni	Paschim Medinipur	Biman Mahata	BJP	AITC
237	Binpur (ST)	Jhargram	Pranat Tudu	BJP	AITC
238	Bandwan (ST)	Purulia	Labsen Baskey	BJP	AITC

Prior to delimitation, Jhargram Lok Sabha constituency was composed of the following assembly segments: Garhbeta East (assembly constituency no. 220), Garhbeta West (SC) (assembly constituency no. 221), Salbani (assembly constituency no. 222), Nayagram (ST) (assembly constituency no. 229), Gopiballavpur (assembly constituency no. 230), Jhargram (assembly constituency no. 231), Binpur (ST) (assembly constituency no. 232)

== Members of Parliament ==
Year	Member	Party
1952 (Note: Midnapore-Jhargram)	Subodh Chandra Hansda	Indian National Congress
1957 (Note: Midnapore-Jhargram)	Subodh Chandra Hansda	Indian National Congress
1962	Subodh Chandra Hansda	Indian National Congress
1967	Amiya Kumar Kisku	Bangla Congress
1971	Amiya Kumar Kisku	Indian National Congress
1977	Jadunath Kisku	Communist Party of India (Marxist)
1980	Matilal Hansda	Communist Party of India (Marxist)
1984	Matilal Hansda	Communist Party of India (Marxist)
1989	Matilal Hansda	Communist Party of India (Marxist)
1991	Rupchand Murmu	Communist Party of India (Marxist)
1996	Rupchand Murmu	Communist Party of India (Marxist)
1998	Rupchand Murmu	Communist Party of India (Marxist)
1999	Rupchand Murmu	Communist Party of India (Marxist)
2004	Rupchand Murmu	Communist Party of India (Marxist)
2009	Pulin Bihari Baske	Communist Party of India (Marxist)
2014	Uma Saren	Trinamool Congress
2019	Kunar Hembram	Bharatiya Janata Party
2024	Kalipada Soren	Trinamool Congress
2026 (Note: Switched to NCPI as part of AITC Rebels in Lok Sabha.)	Kalipada Soren	Nationalist Citizens Party of India

== Election results ==
=== General election 2024 ===
2024 Indian general elections: Jhargram
Party	Candidate	Votes	%	±%
AITC	Kalipada Soren	743,478	49.87	▲6.15
BJP	Dr. Pranat Tudu	5,69,430	38.20	▼6.36
CPI(M)	Sonamani Murmu (Tudu)	77,302	5.19	▼0.19
JPP	Surya Singh Besra	19,494	1.31	N/A
NOTA	None of the above	15,920	1.07	▼0.19
Majority		1,74,048	11.67	▲10.83
Turnout		14,90,843	83.76	▲1.95
AITC gain from BJP		Swing		

=== General Election 2019 ===
2019 Indian general election:Jhargram
Party	Candidate	Votes	%	±%
BJP	Kunar Hembram	626,583	44.56	+34.83
AITC	Birbaha Soren	614,816	43.72	−10.88
CPI(M)	Deblina Hembram	75,680	5.38	−21.12
INC	Joggeshwar Hembram	20,754	1.48	−1.74
NOTA	None of the above	17,692	1.26	
Majority		11,767	0.84	
Turnout		1,407,231	85.71	
BJP gain from AITC		Swing	+22.86	

=== General election 2014 ===
2014 Indian general elections:Jhargram
Party	Candidate	Votes	%	±%
AITC	Dr. Uma Saren	6,74,504	54.60	
CPI(M)	Dr. Pulin Bihari Baske	3,26,621	26.50	
BJP	Bikash Mudi	1,22,459	9.74	
INC	Anita Hansda	40,513	3.22	
NOTA	None of the above	22,935	1.82	+1.82
JMM	Buddhadeb Mandi	15,114	1.20	
Majority		3,47,883	27.66	
Turnout		12,57,613	85.26	
AITC gain from CPI(M)		Swing		

=== General election 2009 ===
2009 Indian general elections:Jhargram
Party	Candidate	Votes	%	±%
CPI(M)	Dr. Pulin Bihari Baske	5,45,231	56.92	−7.28
INC	Amrit Hansda	2,52,886	26.40	
JKP (N)	Chunibala Hansda	48,175	5.00	
BJP	Nabendu Mahali	45,425	4.70	
IND	Aditya Kisku	26,945	2.80	
IND	Sunil Mandi	19,198	2.00	
Majority		2,92,345	30.52	
Turnout		9,58,374	77.19	
CPI(M) hold		Swing		

=== General election 2004 ===
General Election, 2004:Jhargram
Party	Candidate	Votes	%	±%
CPI(M)	Rupchand Murmu	509,045	64.24	
AITC	Nityananda Hembram	157,702	19.90	
Jharkhand Party (Naren)	Khangendranath Hembrom	57,650	7.30	
JMM	Mongal Soren	37,921	4.80	
Independent	Surja Mandi	13,338	1.70	
Independent	Masang Hembram	10,223	1.30	
Independent	Leba Chand Tudu	9,433	1.20	
Majority		351,343	44.34%	
Turnout		795,312	77.19	
CPI(M) hold		Swing		

=== General election 1999 ===
General Election, 1999:Jhargram
Party	Candidate	Votes	%	±%
CPI(M)	Rupchand Murmu	402,325	50.82%	
AITC	Dakhin Murmu	293,644	37.09%	
JKP(N)	Biswanath Murmu	84,332	10.65%	
JMM	Aloke Kumar Mandi	9,592	1.21%	
BSP	Gopi Nath Mandi	1,807	023%	
Turnout		791,700	79.85%	
CPI(M) hold		Swing		

=== General elections 1962-2004 ===
Most of the contests were multi-cornered. However, only winners and runners-up are mentioned below:

Year	Winner	Party	Runner-up	Party	Ref.
1962	Subodh Hansda	INC	Gopinath Saren	CPI	
1967	Amiya Kumar Kisku	INC	Jadu Nath Kisku	CPI(M)	
1971	Amiya Kumar Kisku	INC	Jadu Nath Kisku	CPI(M)	
1977	Jadu Nath Kisku	CPI(M)	Amiya Kumar Kisku	INC	
1980	Matilal Hansda	CPI(M)	Tushar Tudu	INC(I)	
1984	Matilal Hansda	CPI(M)	Amiya Kumar Kisku	INC	
1989	Matilal Hansda	CPI(M)	Panchanan Hansda	INC	
1991	Rupchand Murmu	CPI(M)	Amiya Kumar Kisku	JKP	
1996	Rupchand Murmu	CPI(M)	Subodh Hansda	INC	
1998	Rupchand Murmu	CPI(M)	Samay Mandi	AITC	
1999	Rupchand Murmu	CPI(M)	Dakhin Murmu	AITC	
2004	Rupchand Murmu	CPI(M)	Nityananda Hembram	AITC	

== See also ==
- Jhargram
- List of constituencies of the Lok Sabha
