= Tourism in Jharkhand =

Tourism in Jharkhand refers to tourism in the Indian state of Jharkhand which plays a significant role in the state’s economy. Jharkhand is known for its scenic landscapes, waterfalls, hills, cultural heritage and religious sites. In 2014, 3,360,000 domestic and 154,731 foreign tourists visited Jharkhand. The Jharkhand Tourism Development Corporation (JTDC) working under the Tourism Department of Government of Jharkhand oversees tourism promotion and the development of related infrastructure across the state.

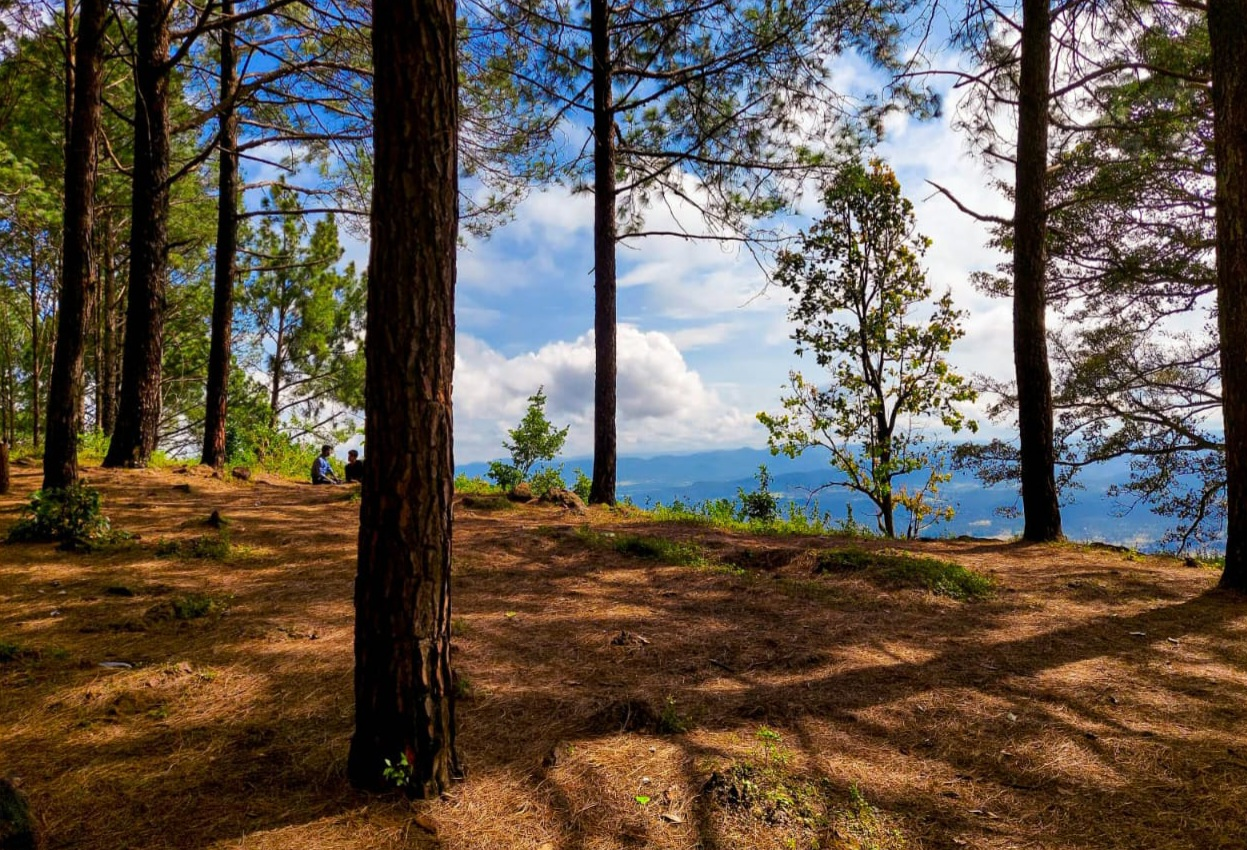
Pine trees at Netarhat Hill Station

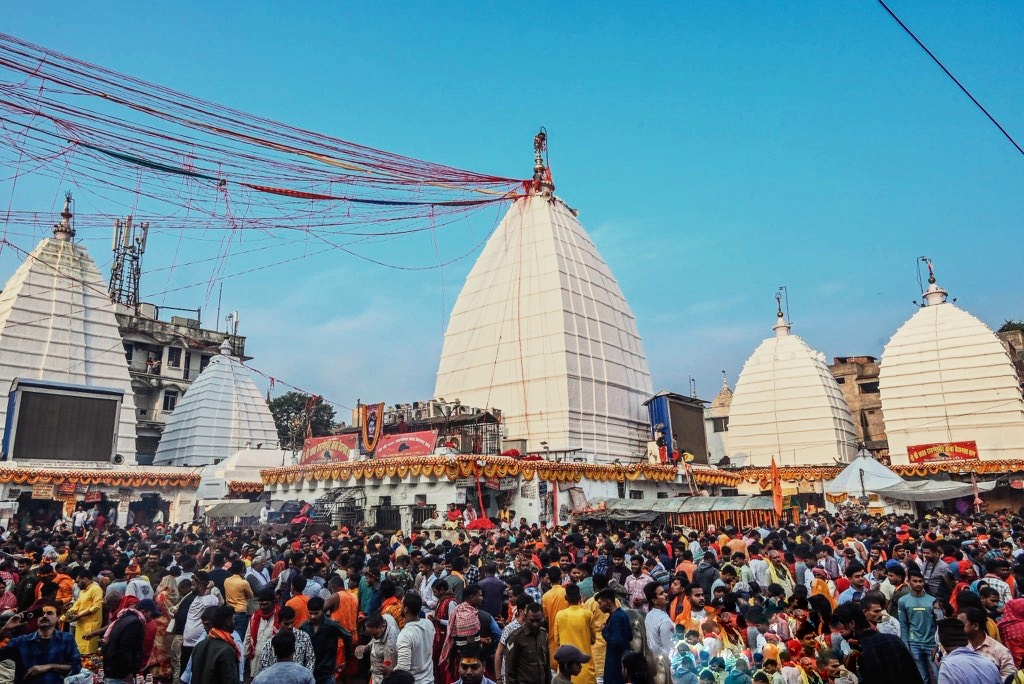
Baidyanath Temple, one of the twelve Jyotirlinga shrines

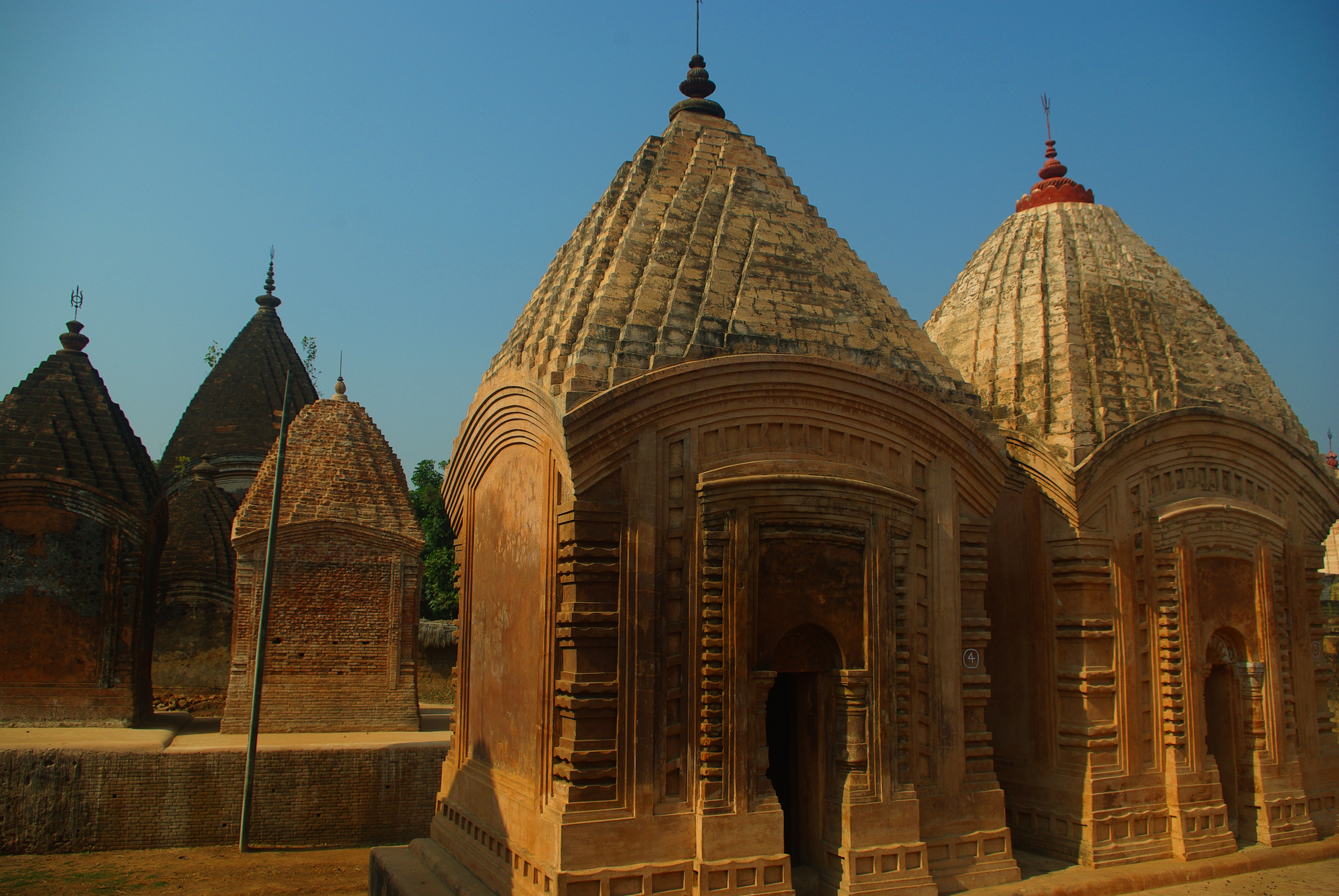
Maluti temple in Dumka district

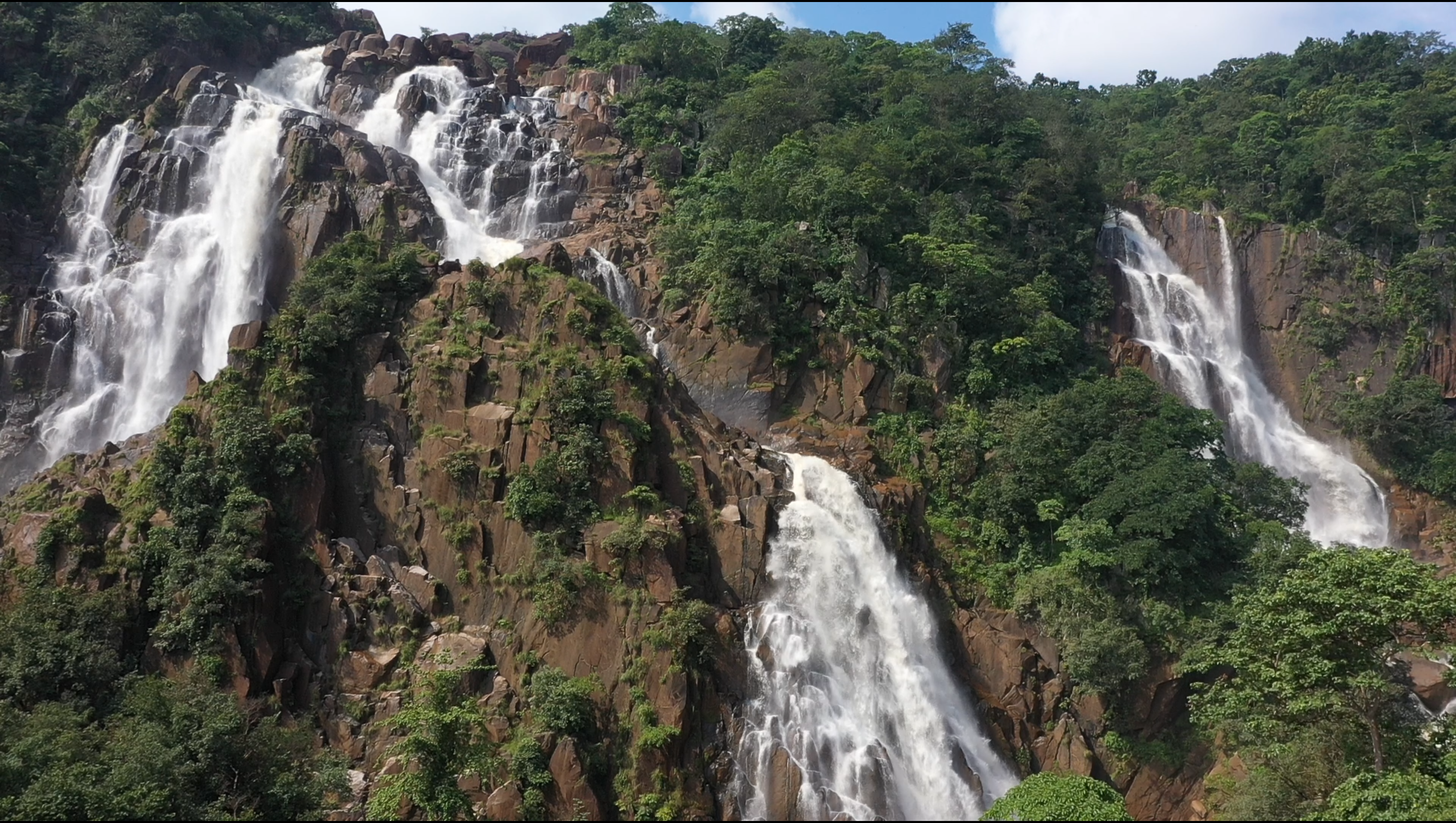
Lodh Falls, one of the highest waterfalls in Jharkhand

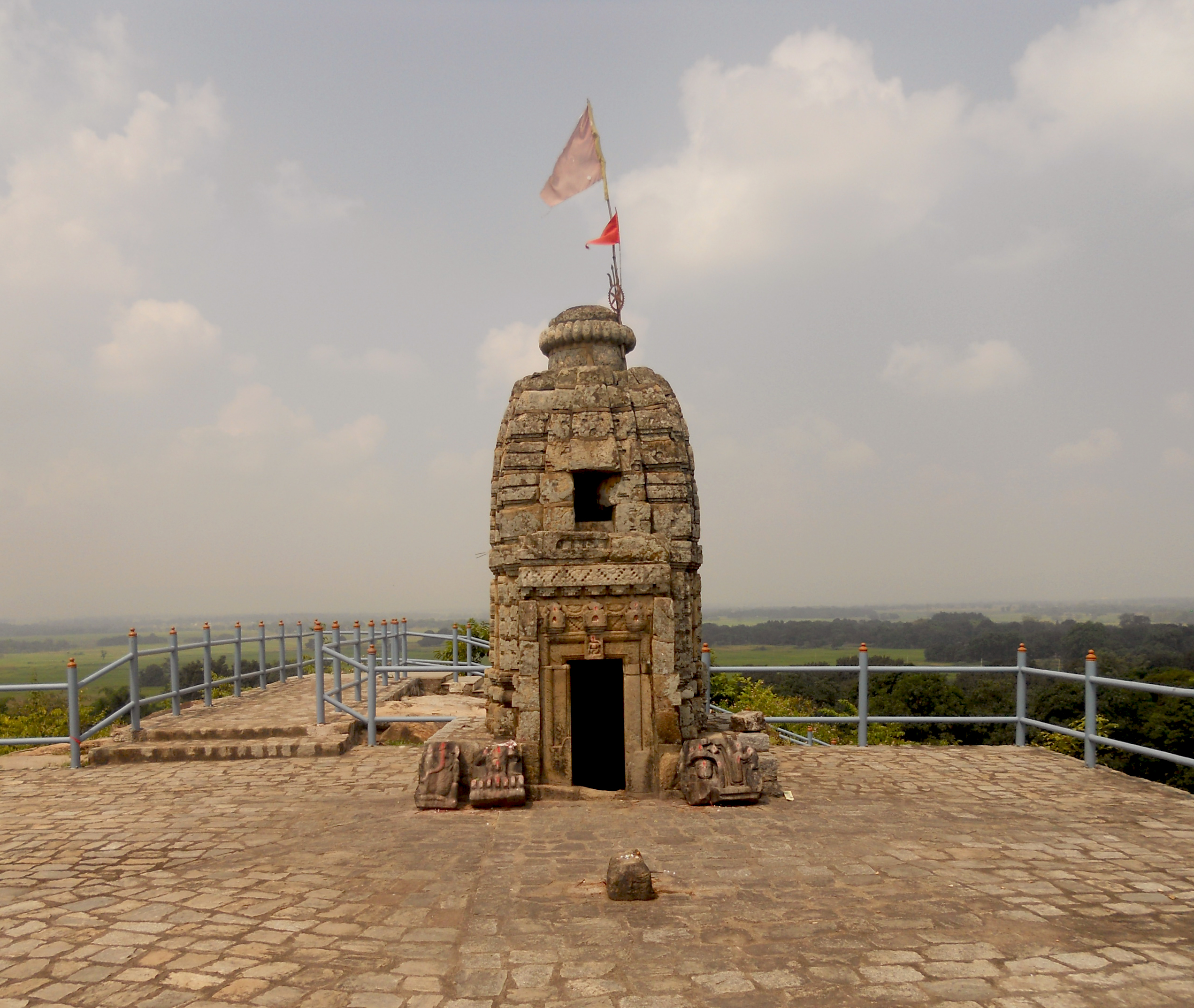
Ancient Khakparta Temple in Lohardaga

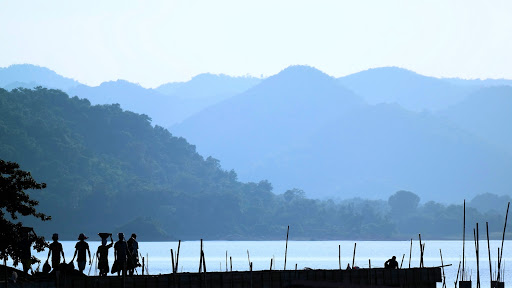
Mayurakshi River near Dumka

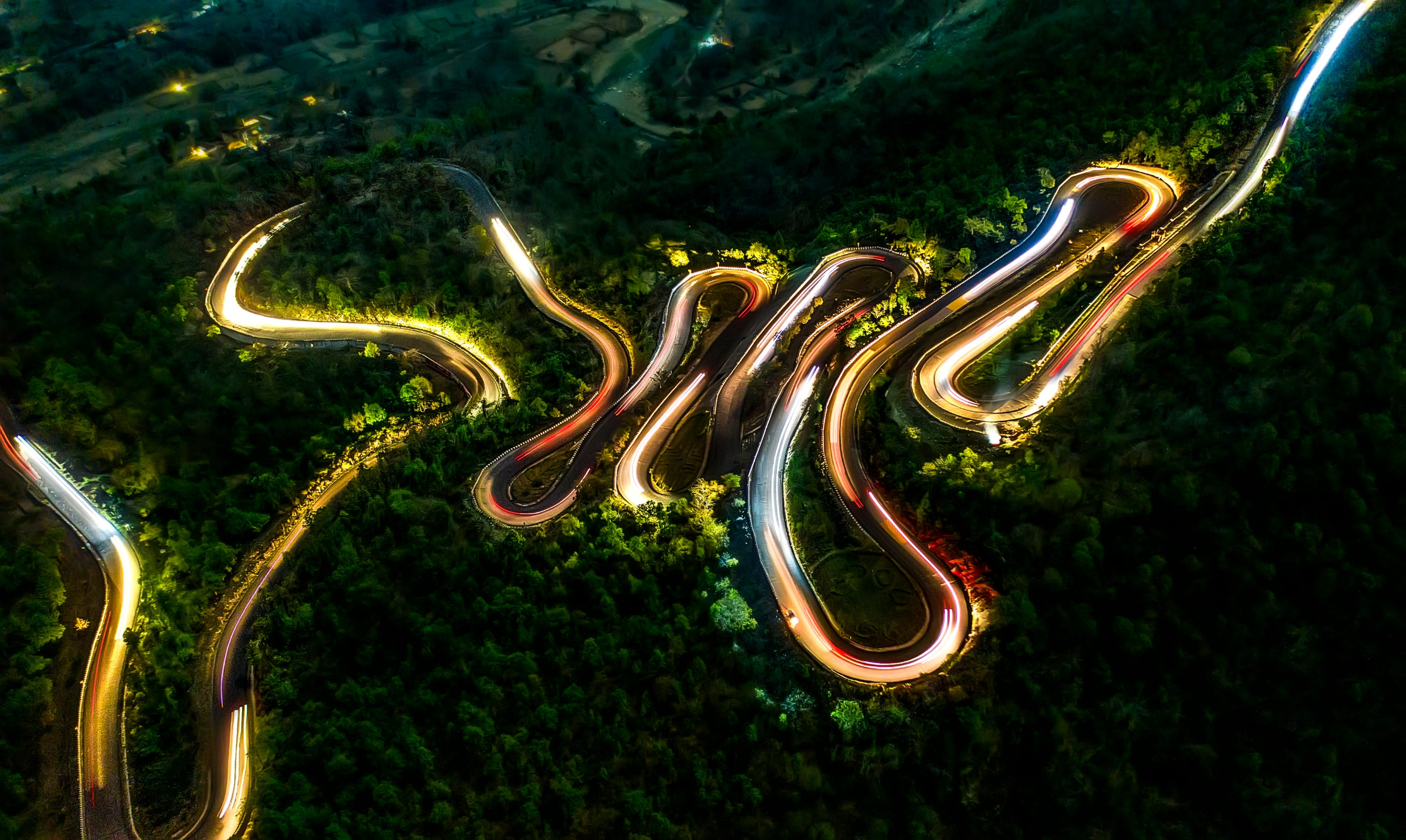
Patratu Valley at night

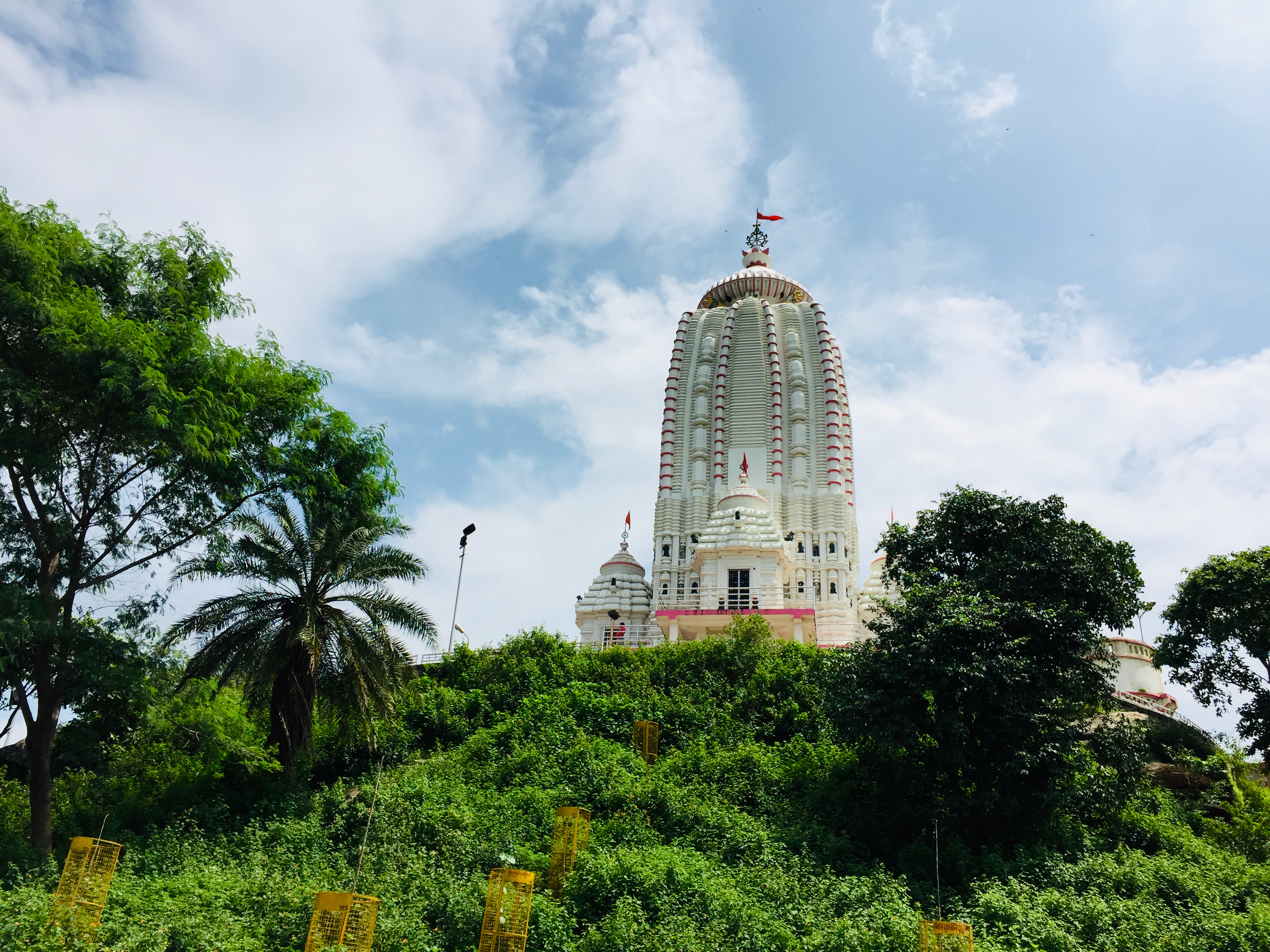
Jagannath Temple, Ranchi, built in the 17th century

== Pilgrim places ==
Parasnath, Baidyanath Dham, Rajrappa, Jagannath Temple and Dewri Temple are major religious places. The Bhadrakali temple in Itkhori built in 9th century A.D. The Buddhist stupas of Itkhori goes backs to 200 BC. It is holy place for Hindus, Buddhists and Jains.

The Kapilnath Temple built by King Ram Shah in 1643 in another pilgrim place in Jharkhand. The Rankini Temple of Jadugora, built in 1947–50, is famous in Jharkhand as well as in Odisha, Bengal and Bihar.

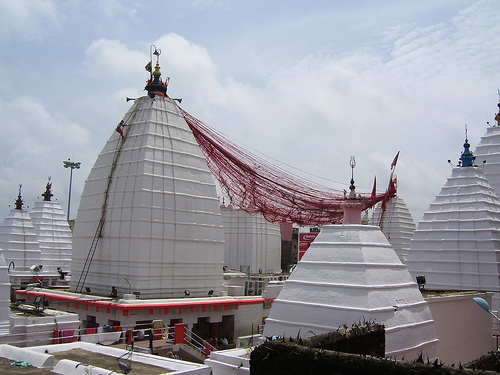
Pyramid shaped Shikhara of the temple, Baidyanath Temple

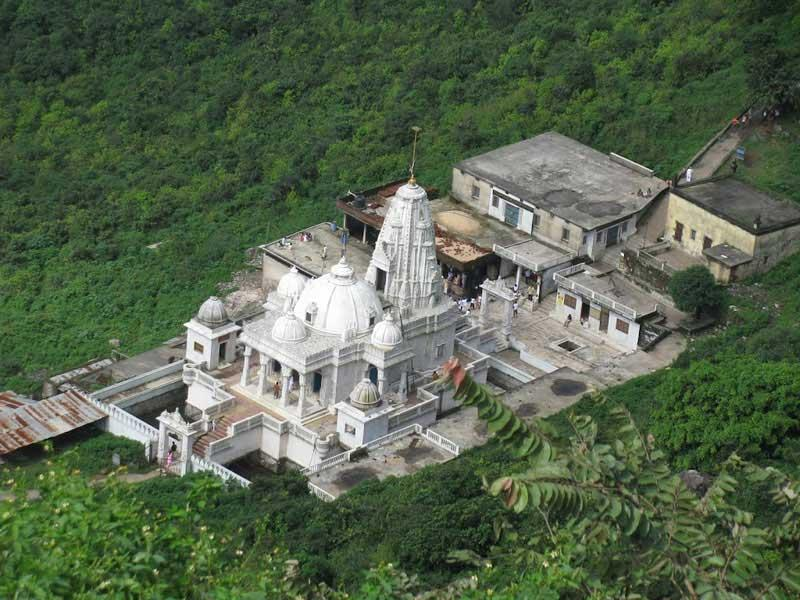
Jal Mandir at Shikharji, Parasnath

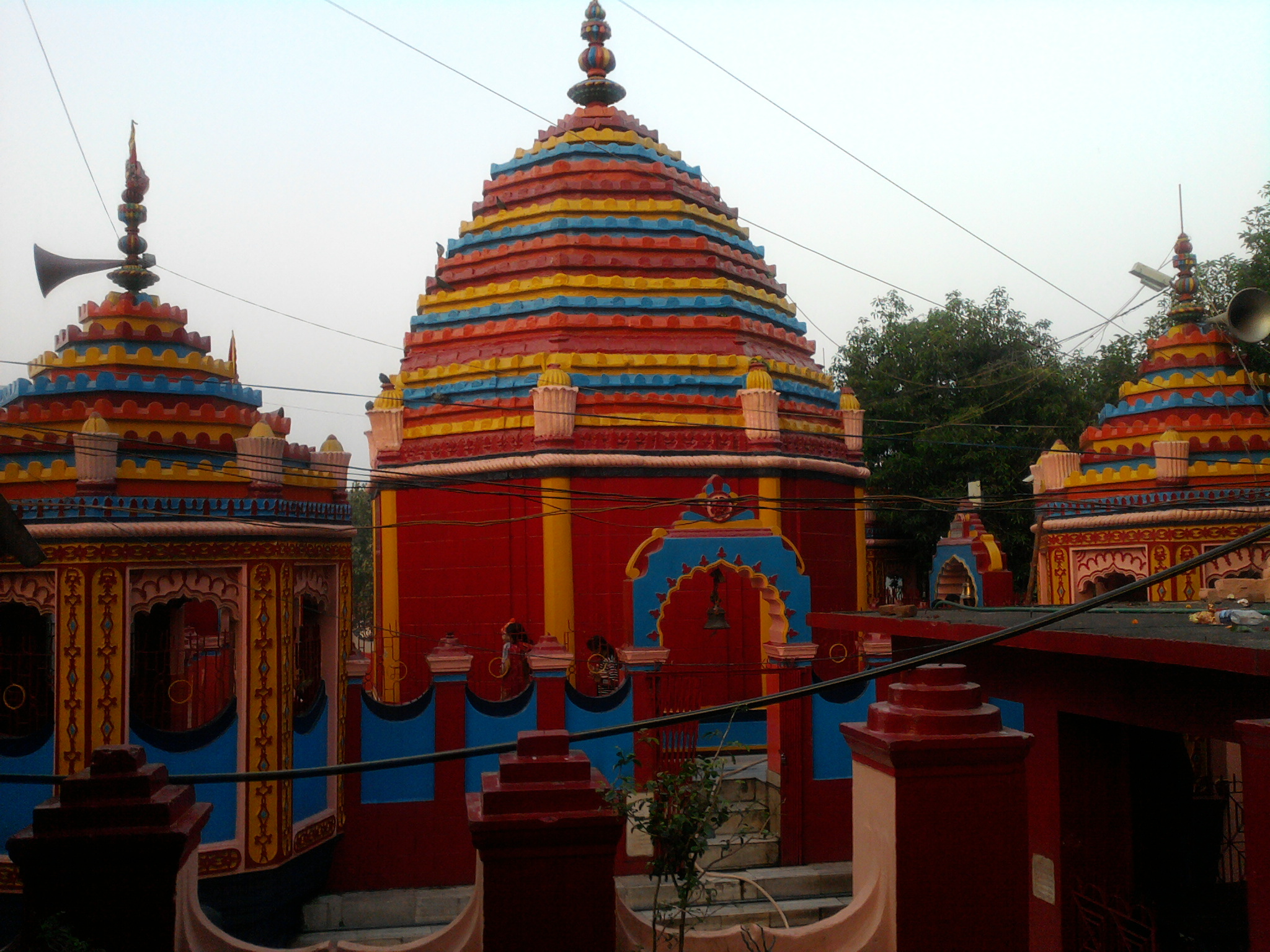
Chhinnamasta Temple of Rajrappa

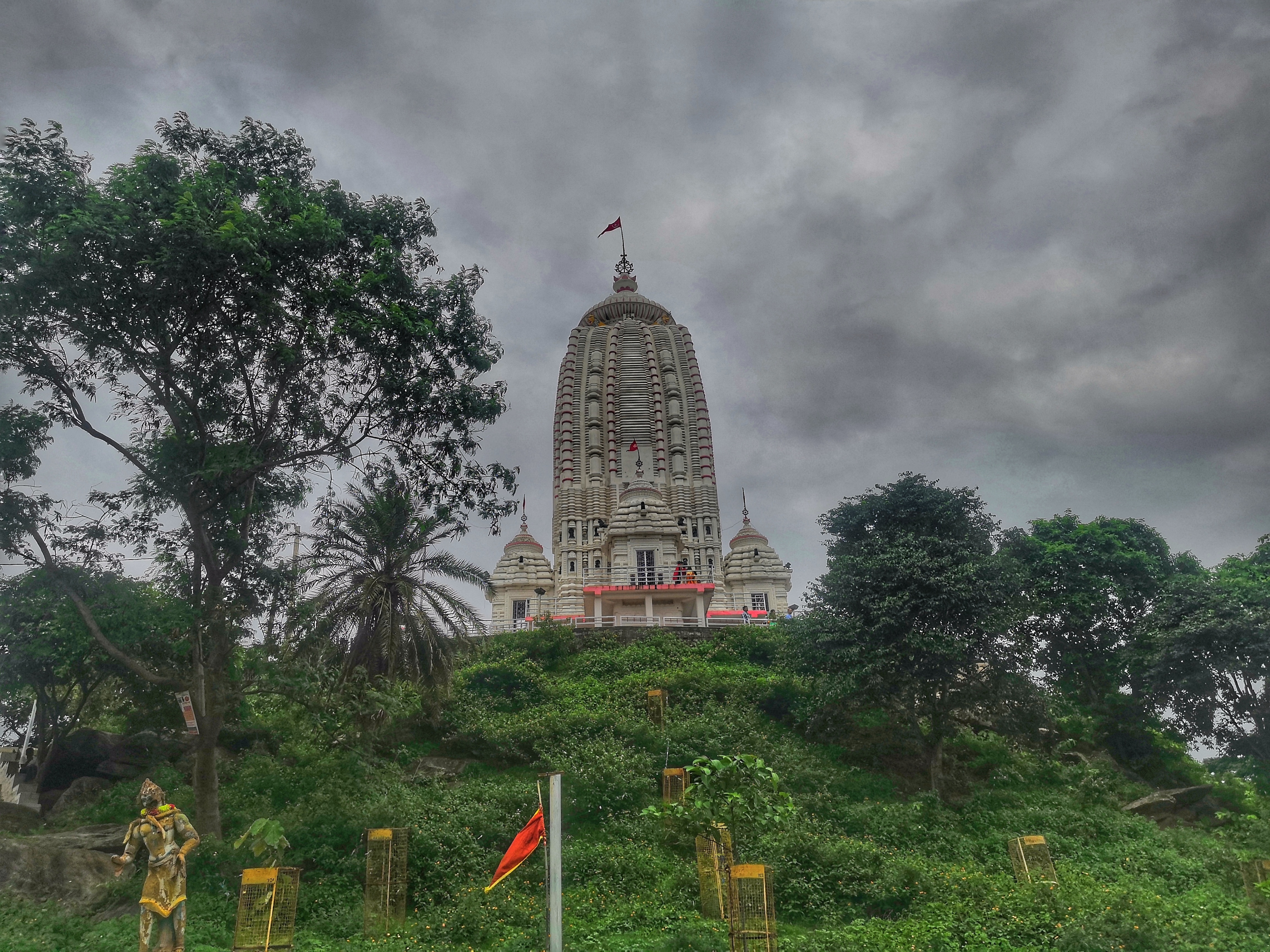
Jagannath Temple of Ranchi

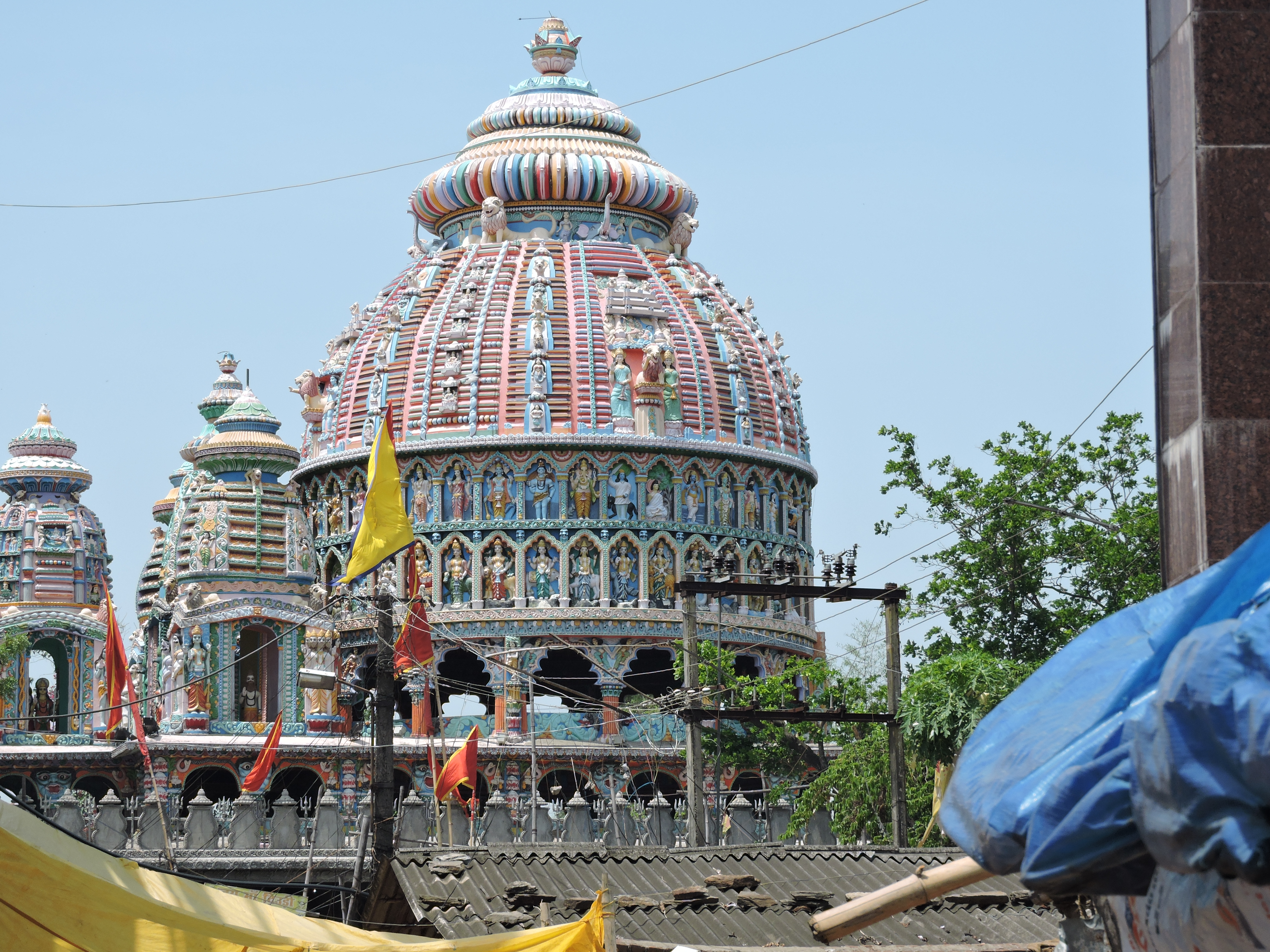
Dewri Temple

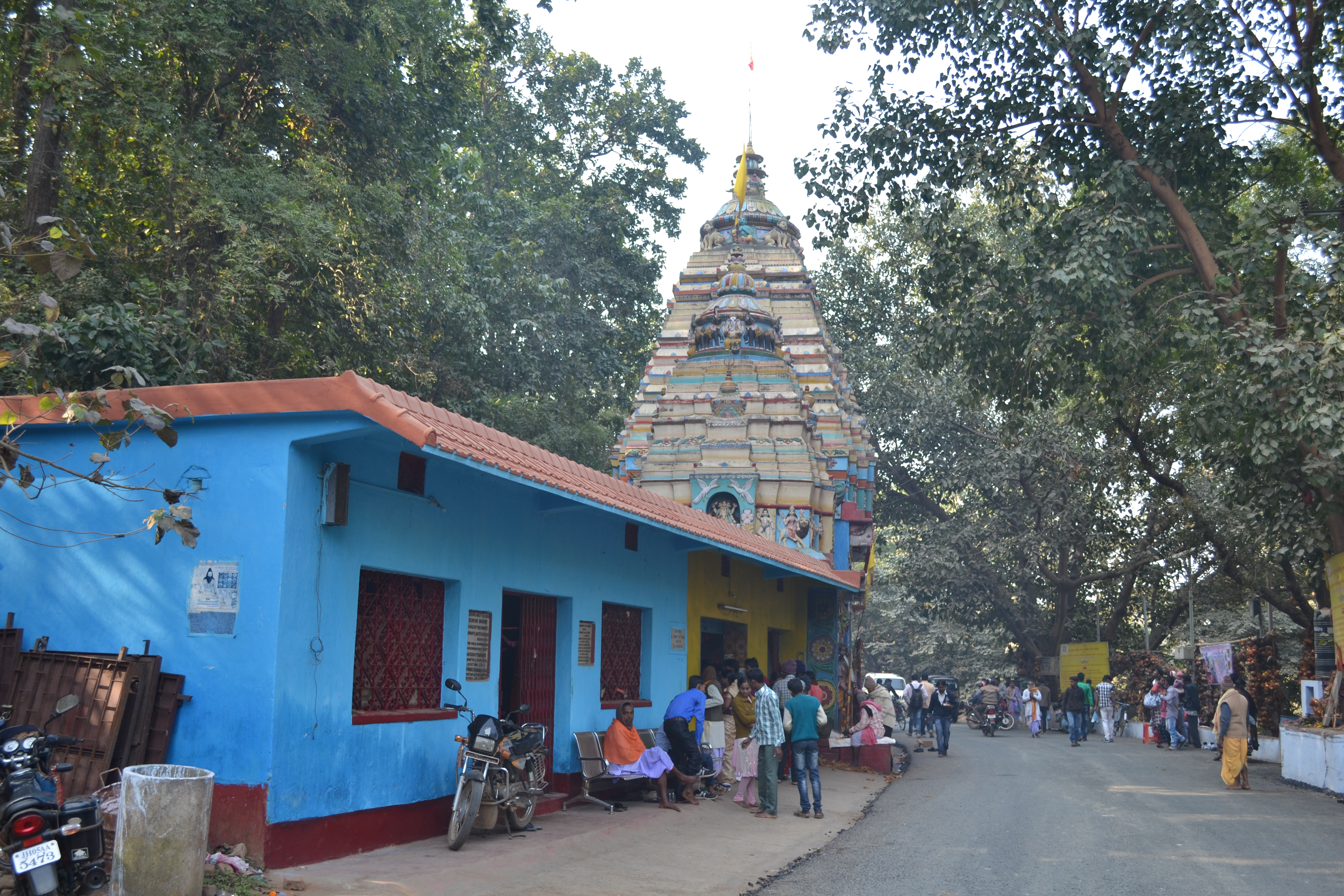
Rankini Temple of Jadugora

== Hill Station ==
Netarhat is a hill station in the state. Parasnath is the highest mountain peak in the state of Jharkhand, and is intervisible with Mount Everest over 450 km to the north

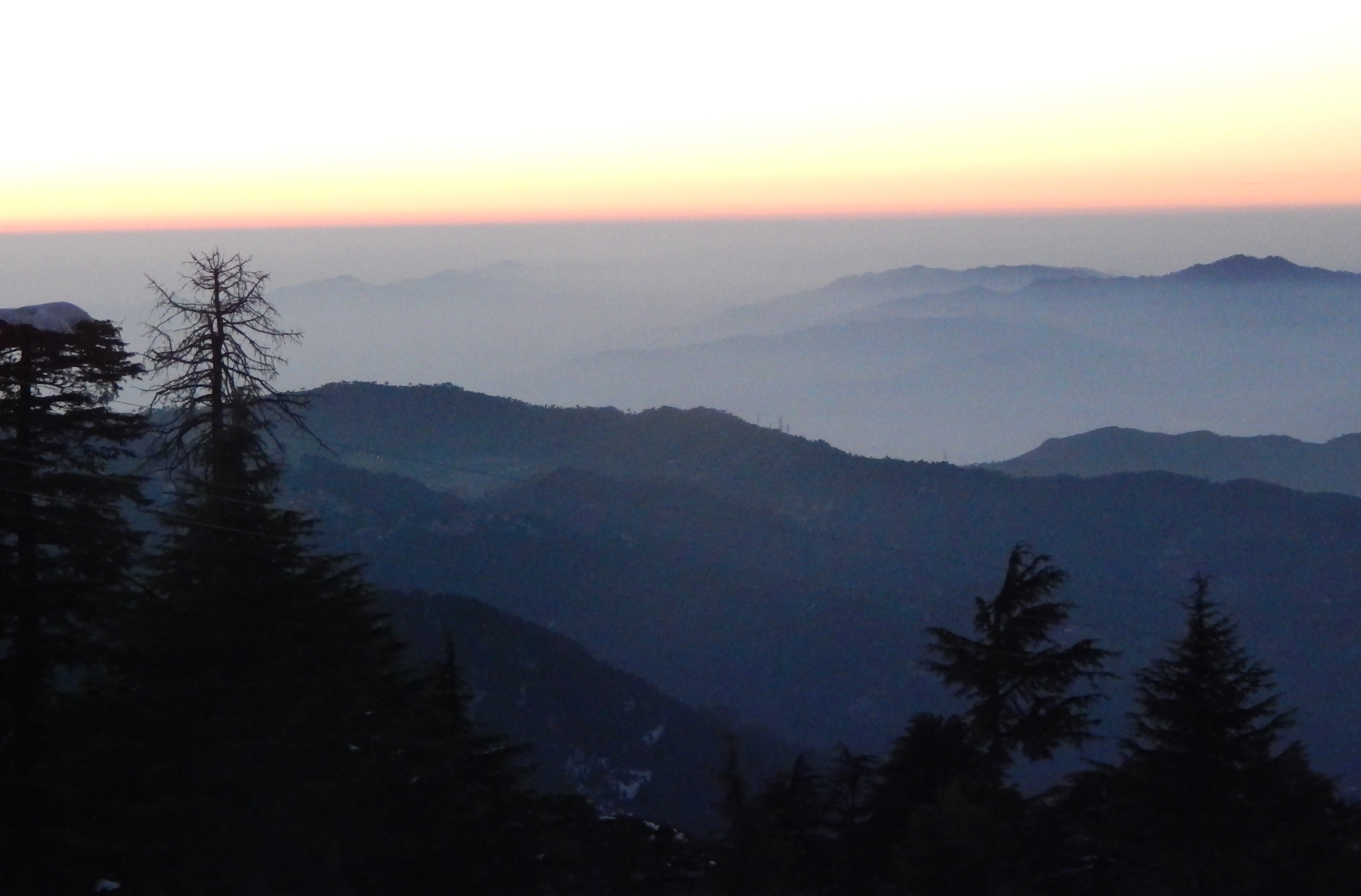
Sunset in Netarhat

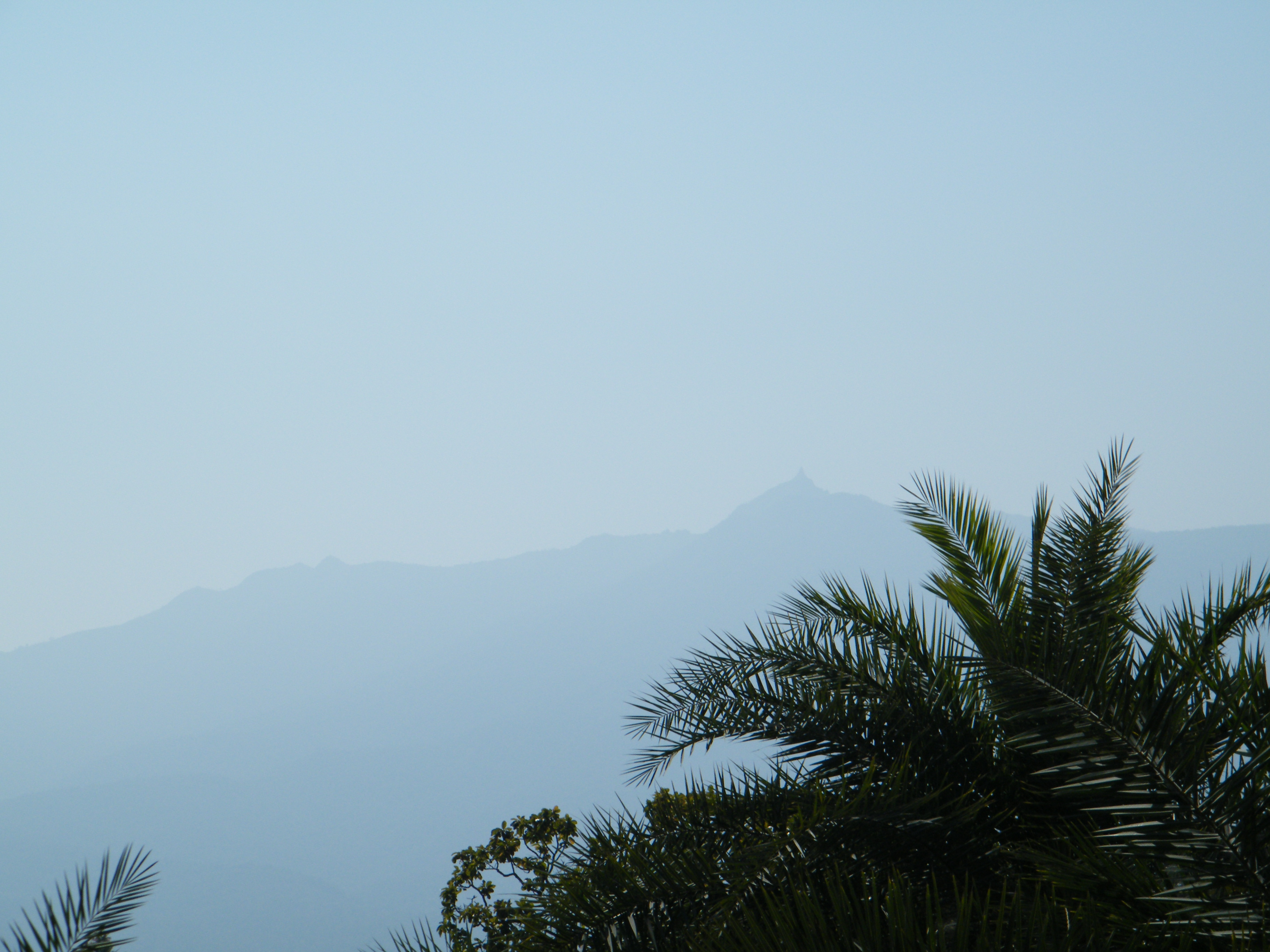
View of shikharji from Parasnath

== Waterfalls of Jharkhand ==
There are several waterfalls in Jharkhand. They are as follows:

- Dassam Falls, Ranchi district
- Hirni Falls, West Singhbhum
- Hundru Falls, Ranchi district
- Jonha Falls, Ranchi district
- Lodh Falls, Latehar district
- Lawapani Falls, Lohardaga district
- Lower Ghaghri Falls, Latehar district
- Panchghagh Falls, Khunti district
- Rajrappa, Ramgarh district
- Sadni Falls, Gumla district
- Sita Falls, Ramgarh district
- Usri Falls, Giridih district

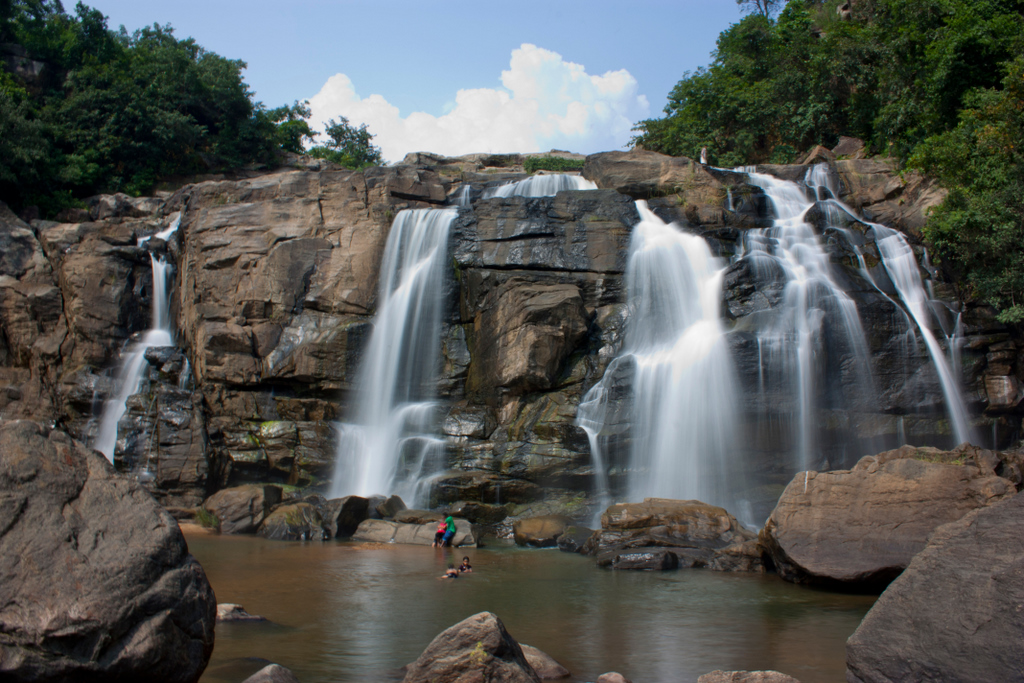
Jonha Falls

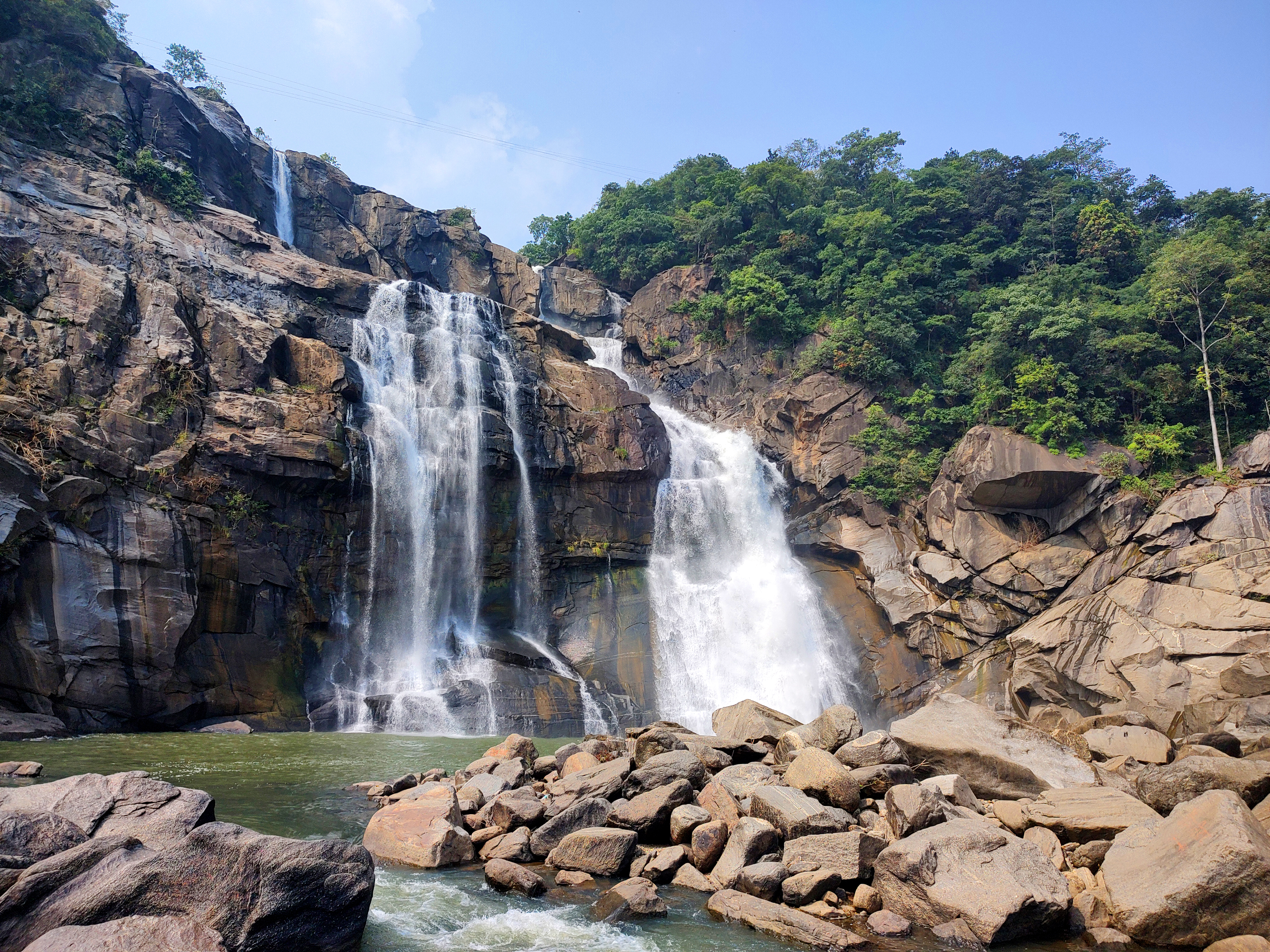
Hundru Falls

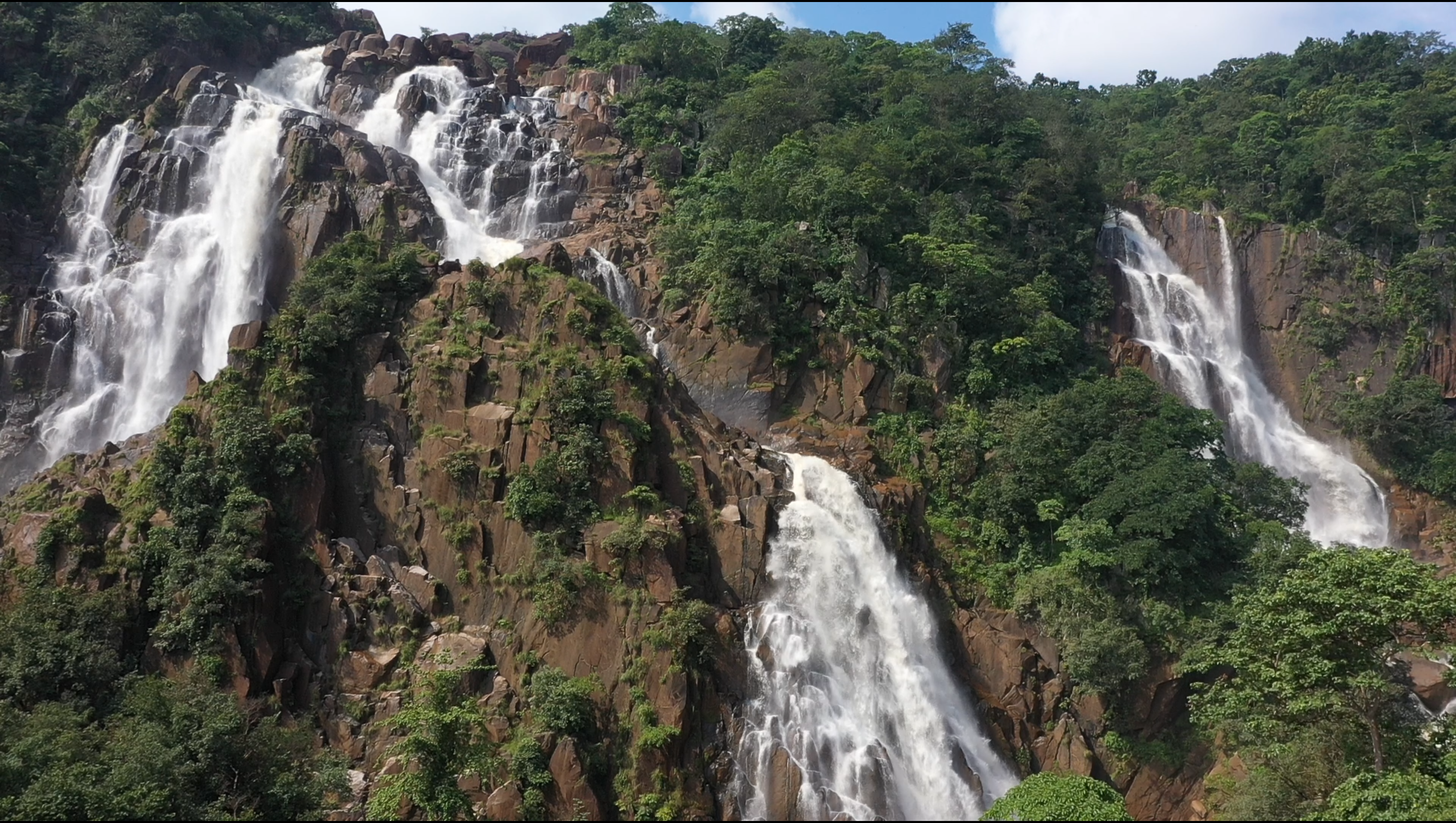
Lodh Falls

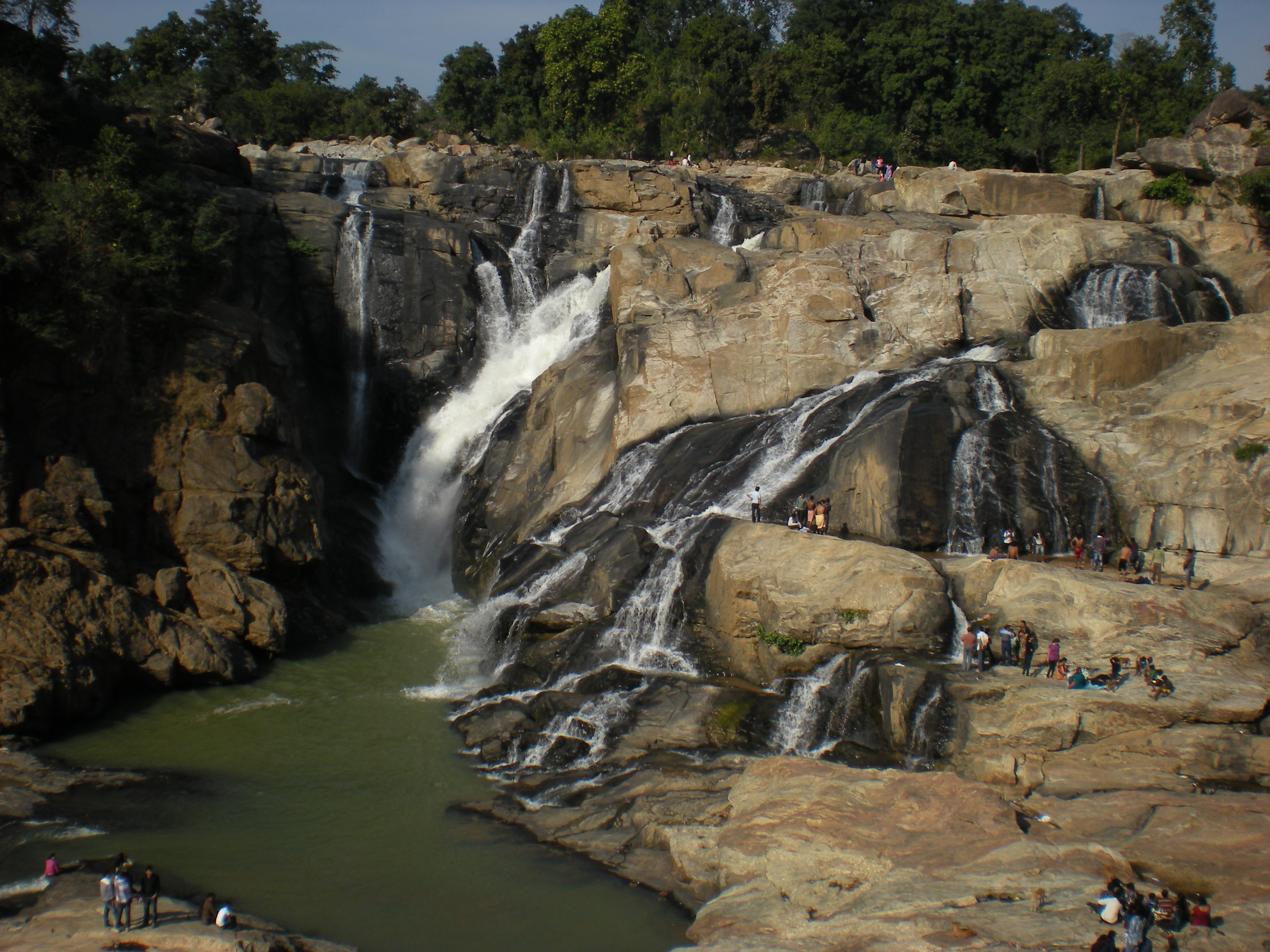
Dassam Falls

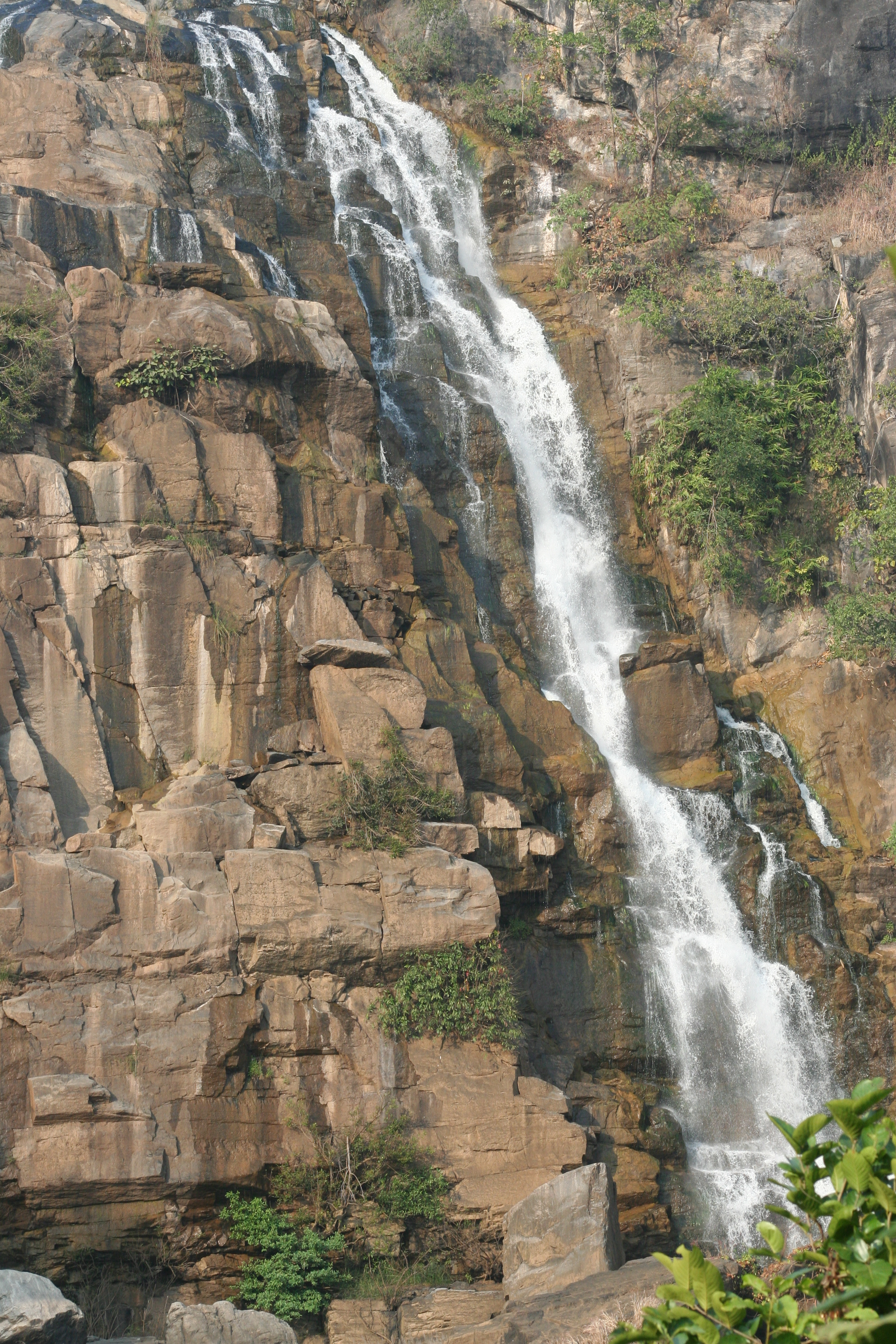
Sita Falls

== Dams ==
There are several dams in state. They are as follows:

- Tilaiya Dam
- Getalsud Dam
- Kanke Dam
- Khandoli Dam
- Konar Dam
- Massanjore Dam
- Maithon Dam
- Panchet Dam
- Patratu Dam
- Tenughat Dam
- Chandil Dam

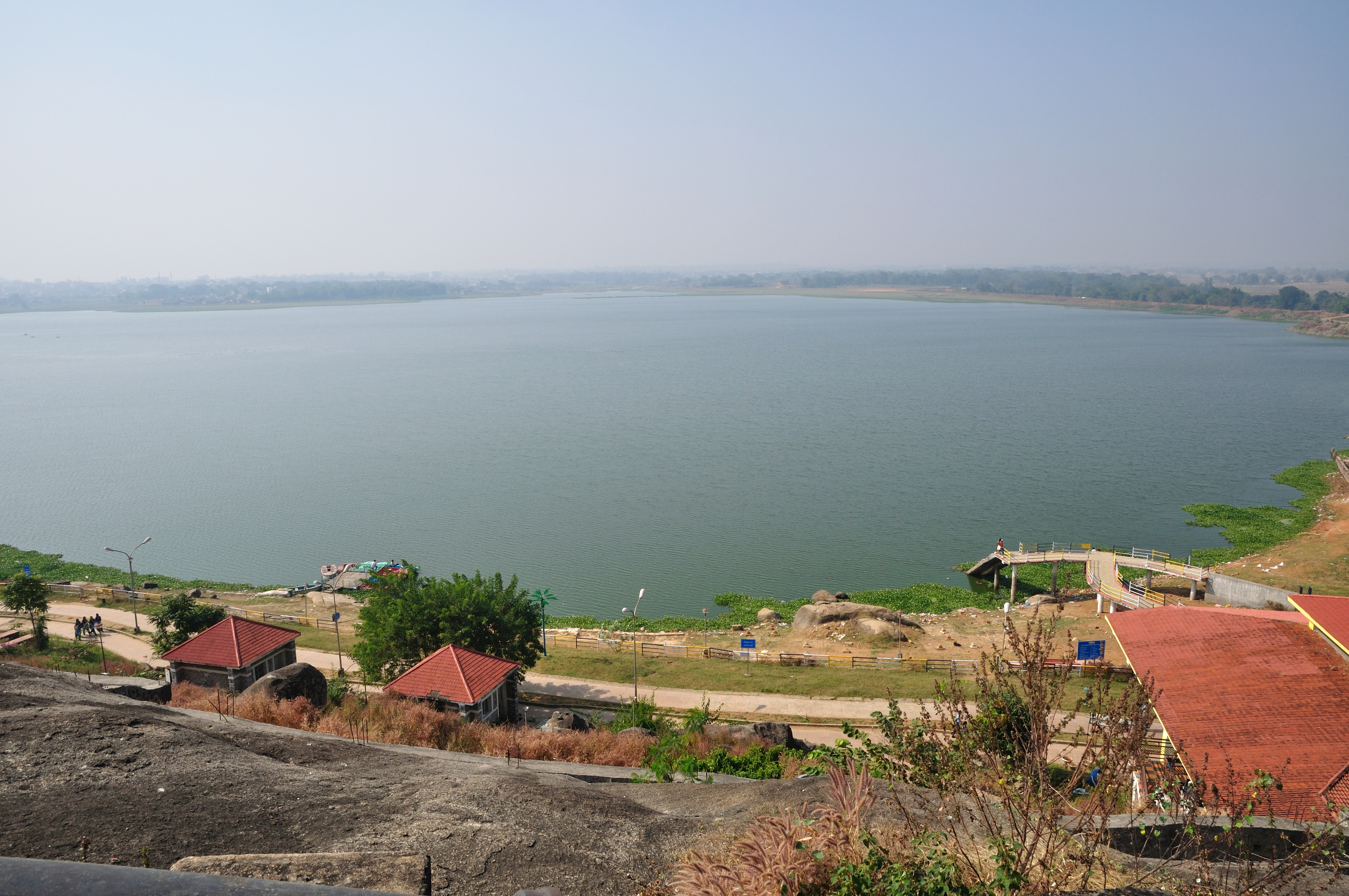
Kanke Dam

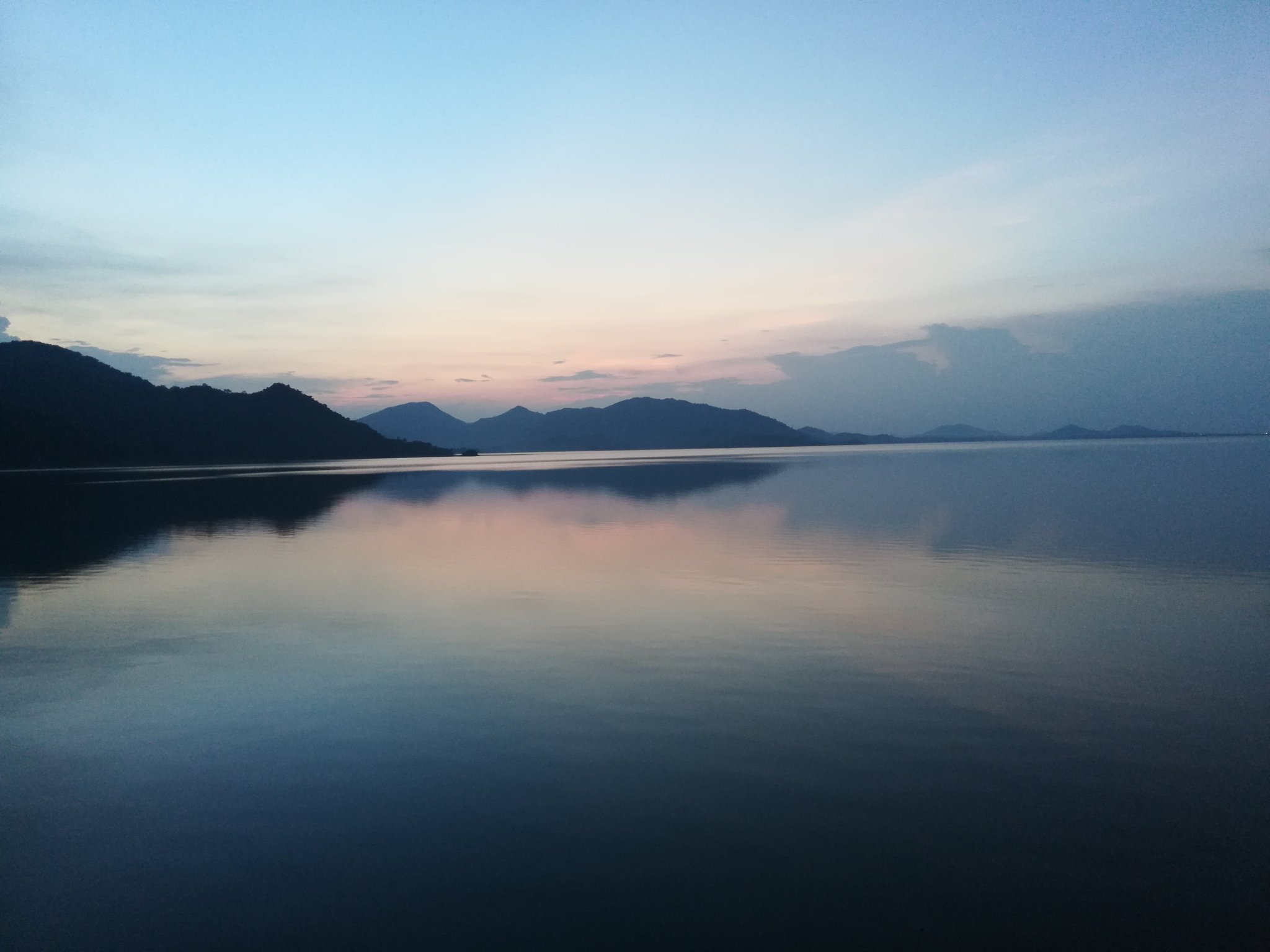
Sunrise view at Massanjore Dam

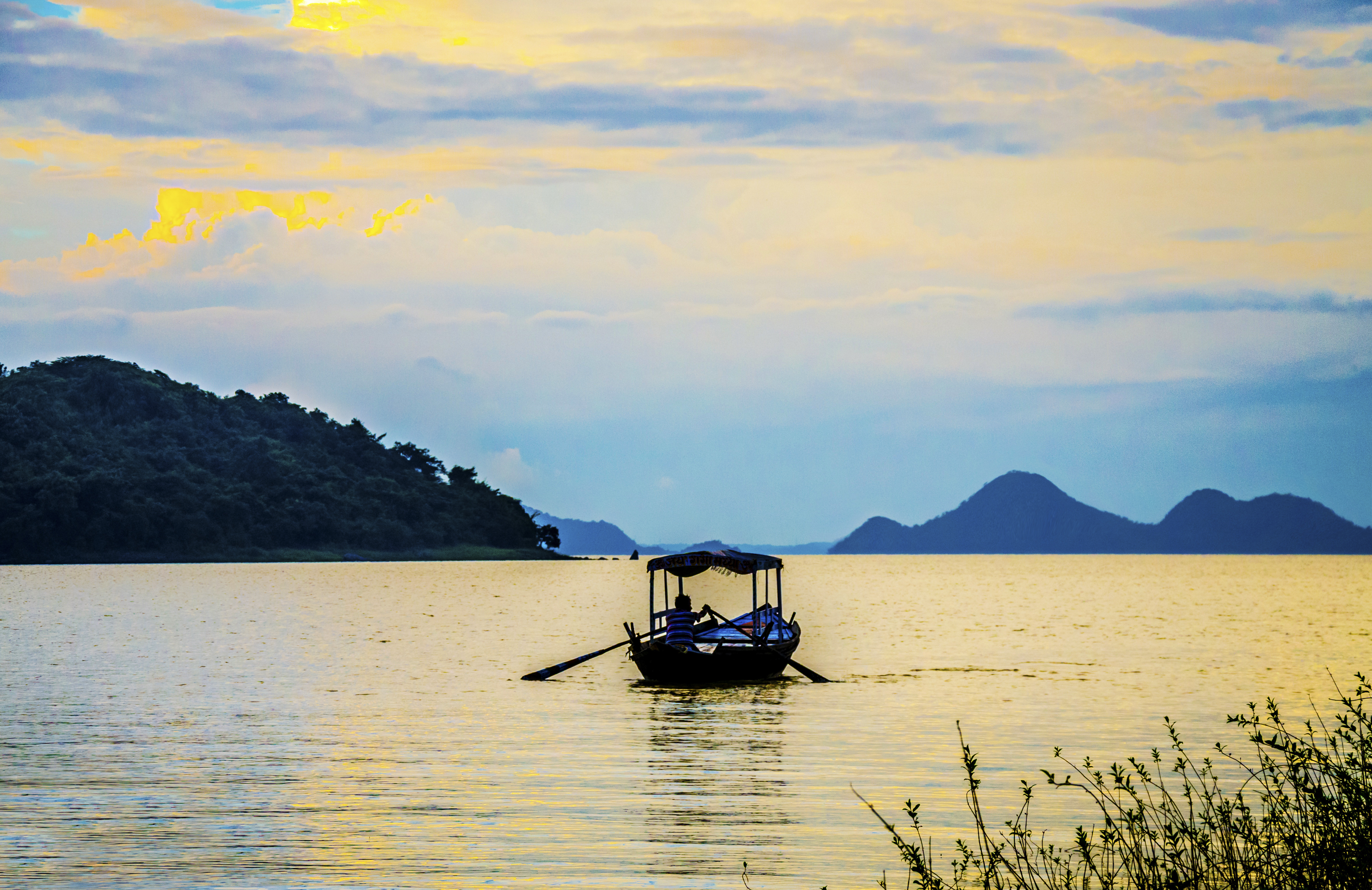
Sunset at Maithon Dam

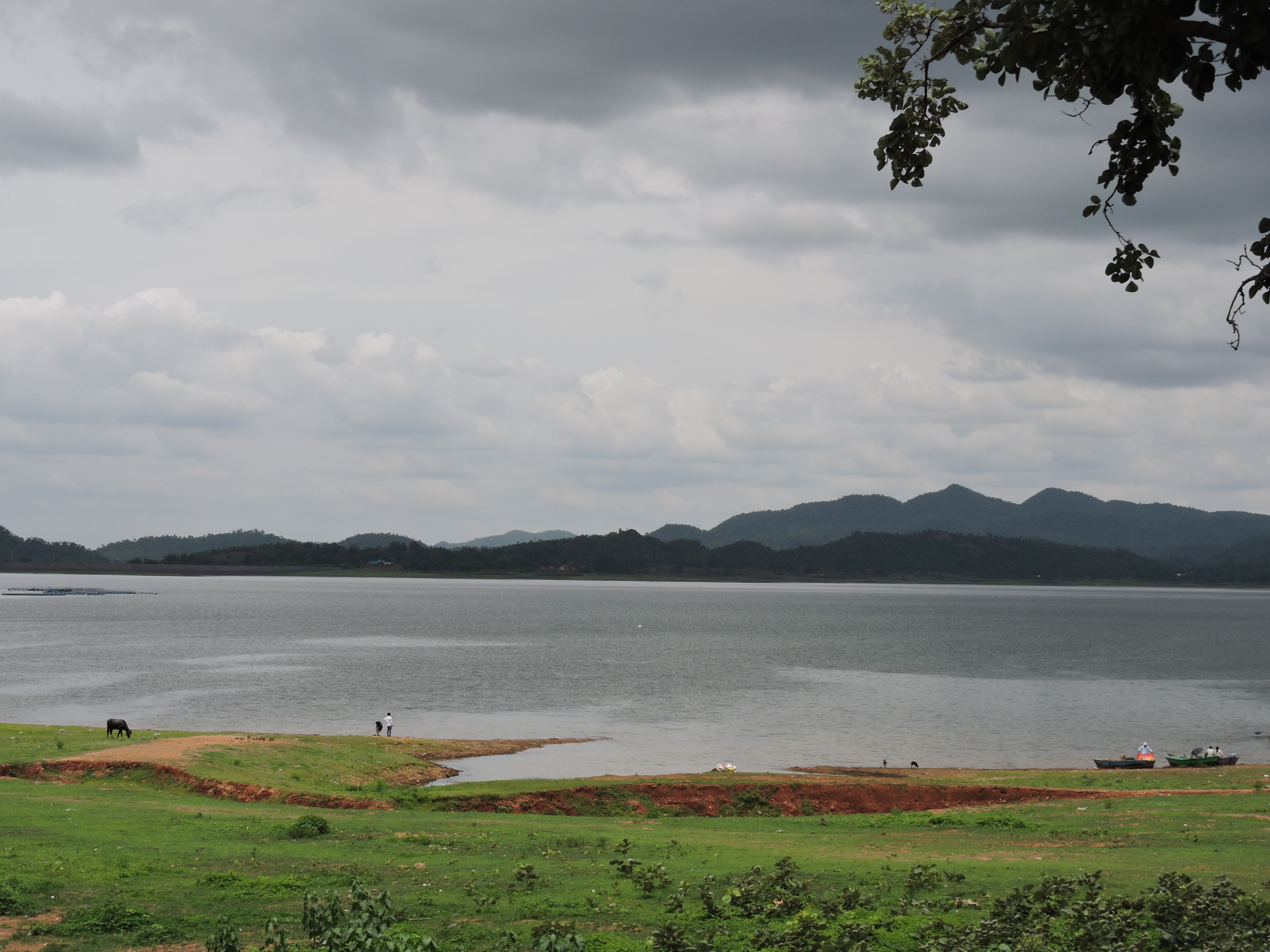
Patratu dam

== Lakes ==
There are several reservoirs or lakes in state. They are as follows:

- Dimna Lake
- Hazaribagh Jheel
- Raja Talab

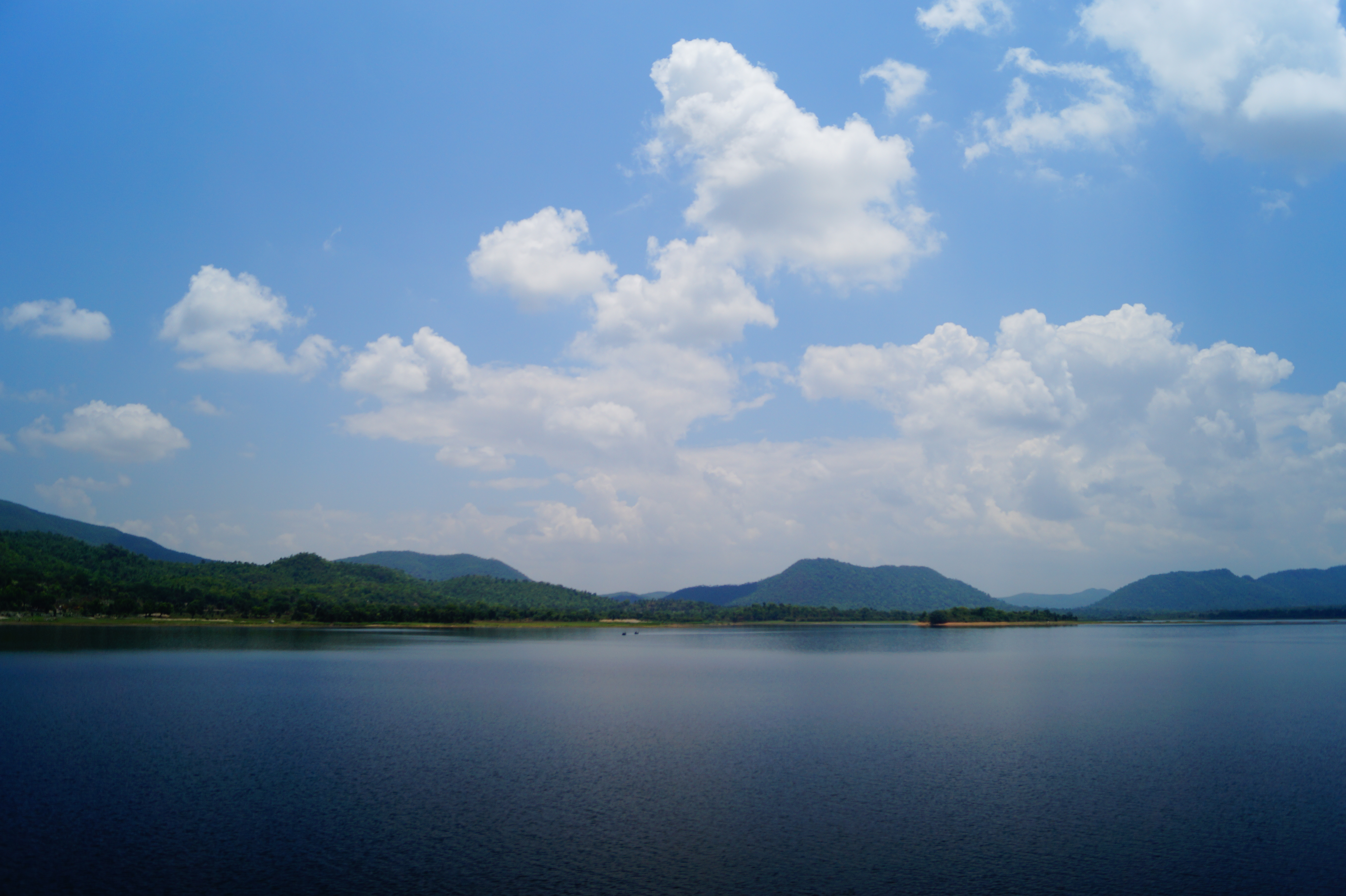
Dimna Lake at Boram, Jamshedpur

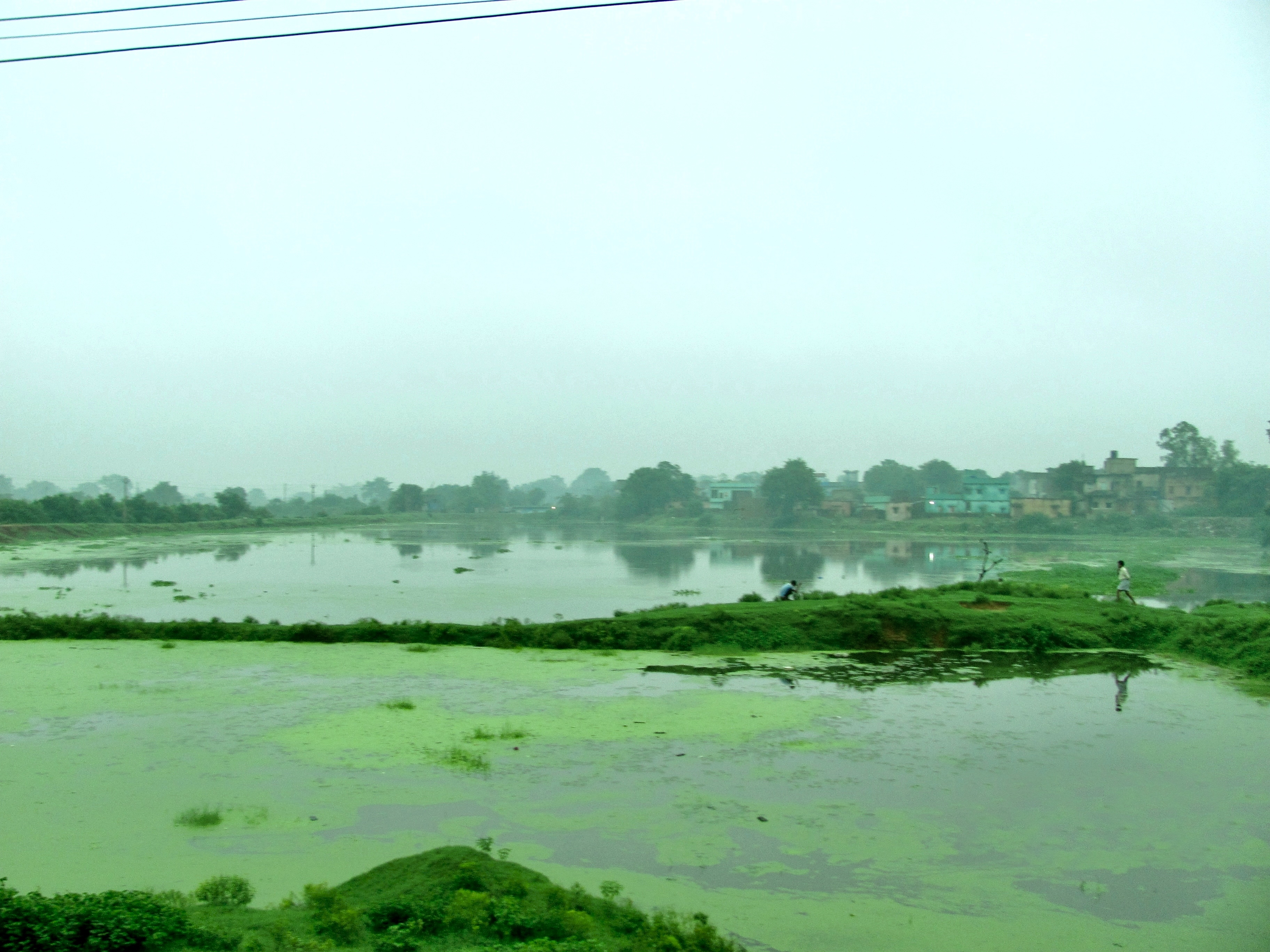
Raja Talab at Jharia

== Wildlife and national parks ==
Jharkhand is known as land of forest. There are several Wildlife Sanctuaries and National Parks including Betla National Park, Hazaribag Wildlife Sanctuary, Dalma Wildlife Sanctuary, Koderma Wildlife Sanctuary, Palkot Wildlife Sanctuary and Mahuadanr Wolf Sanctuary.

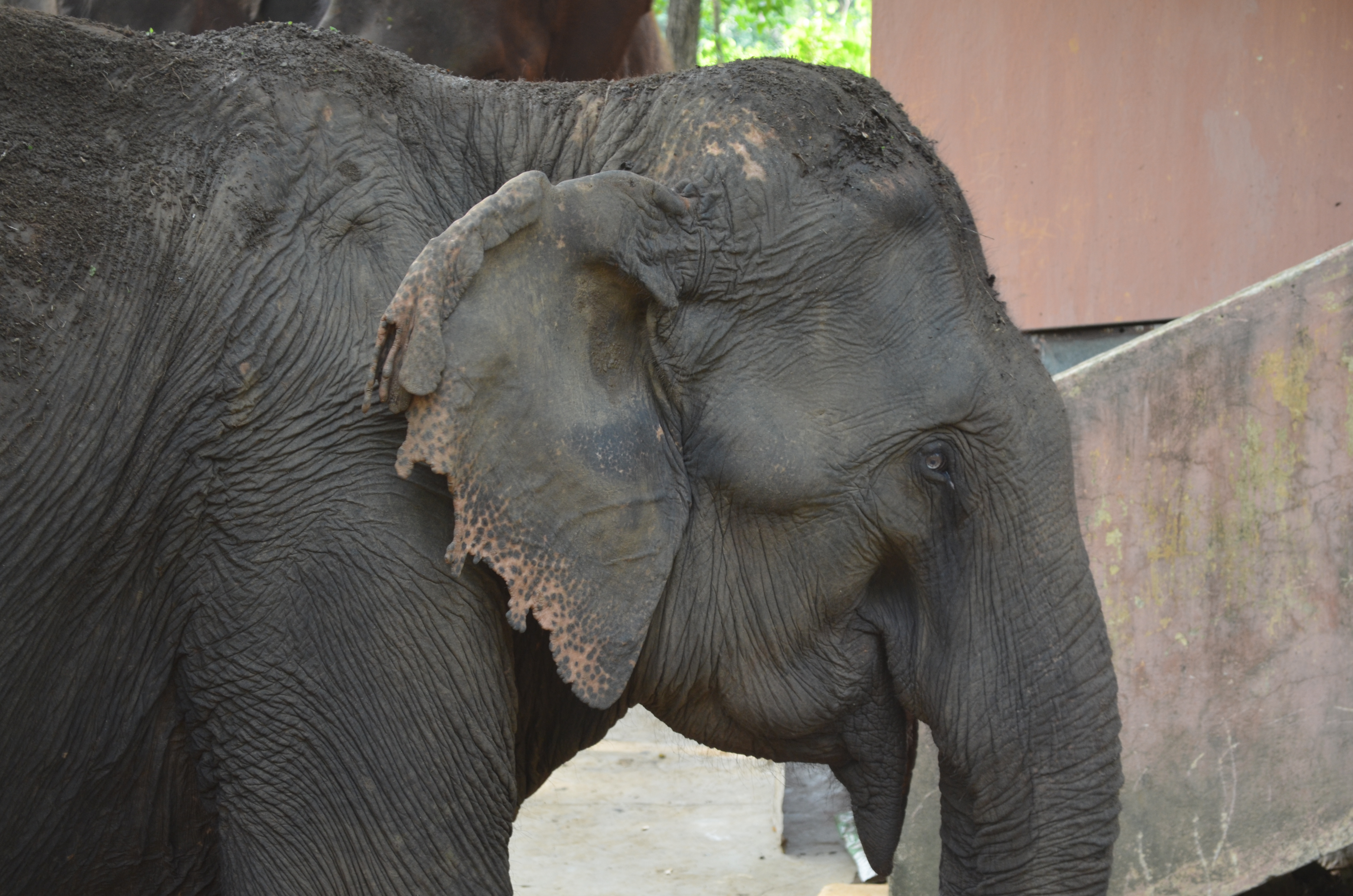
A female Indian Elephant at Dalma Wildlife Sanctuary

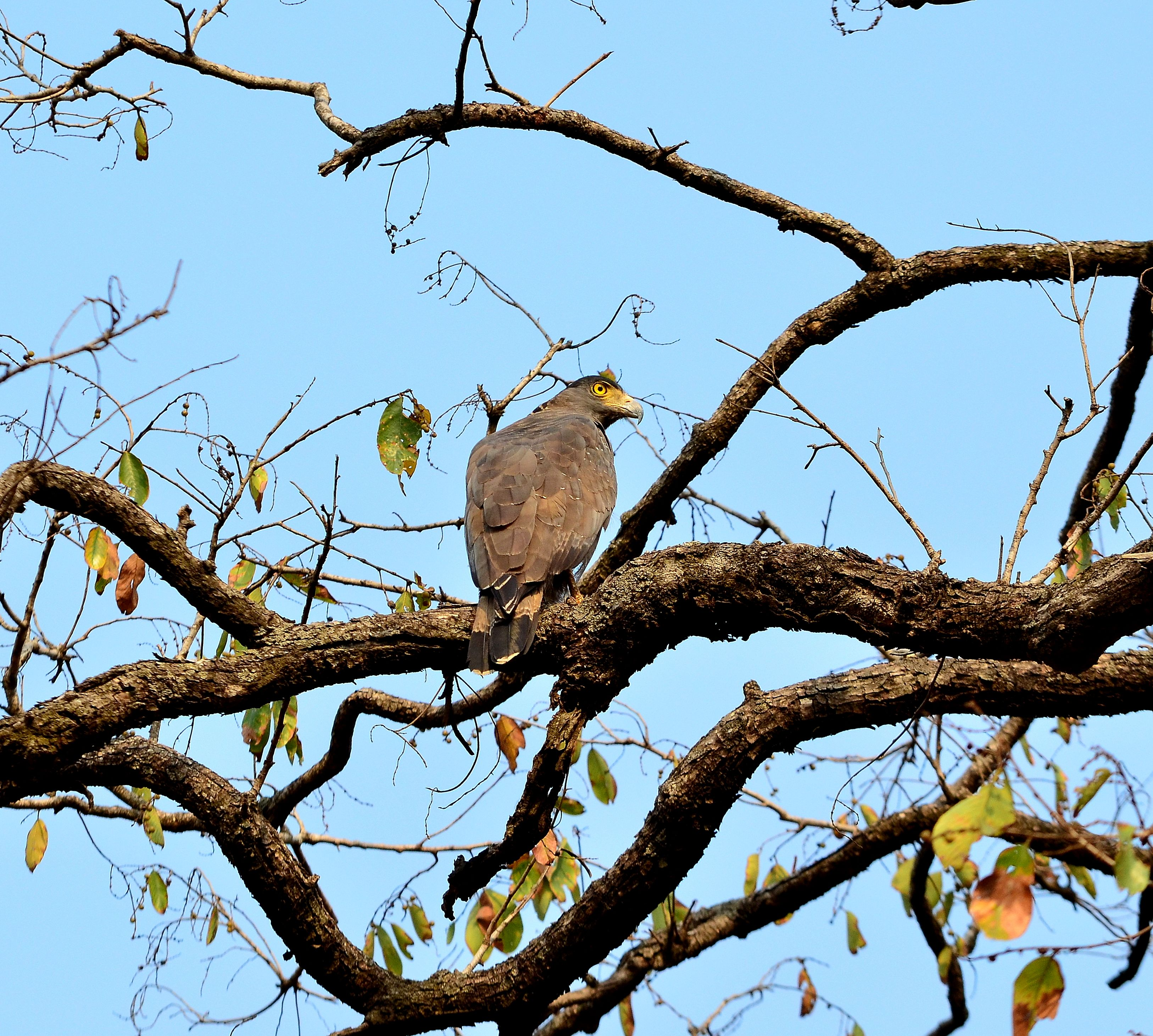
Crested serpent eagle at Dalma Wildlife Sanctuary

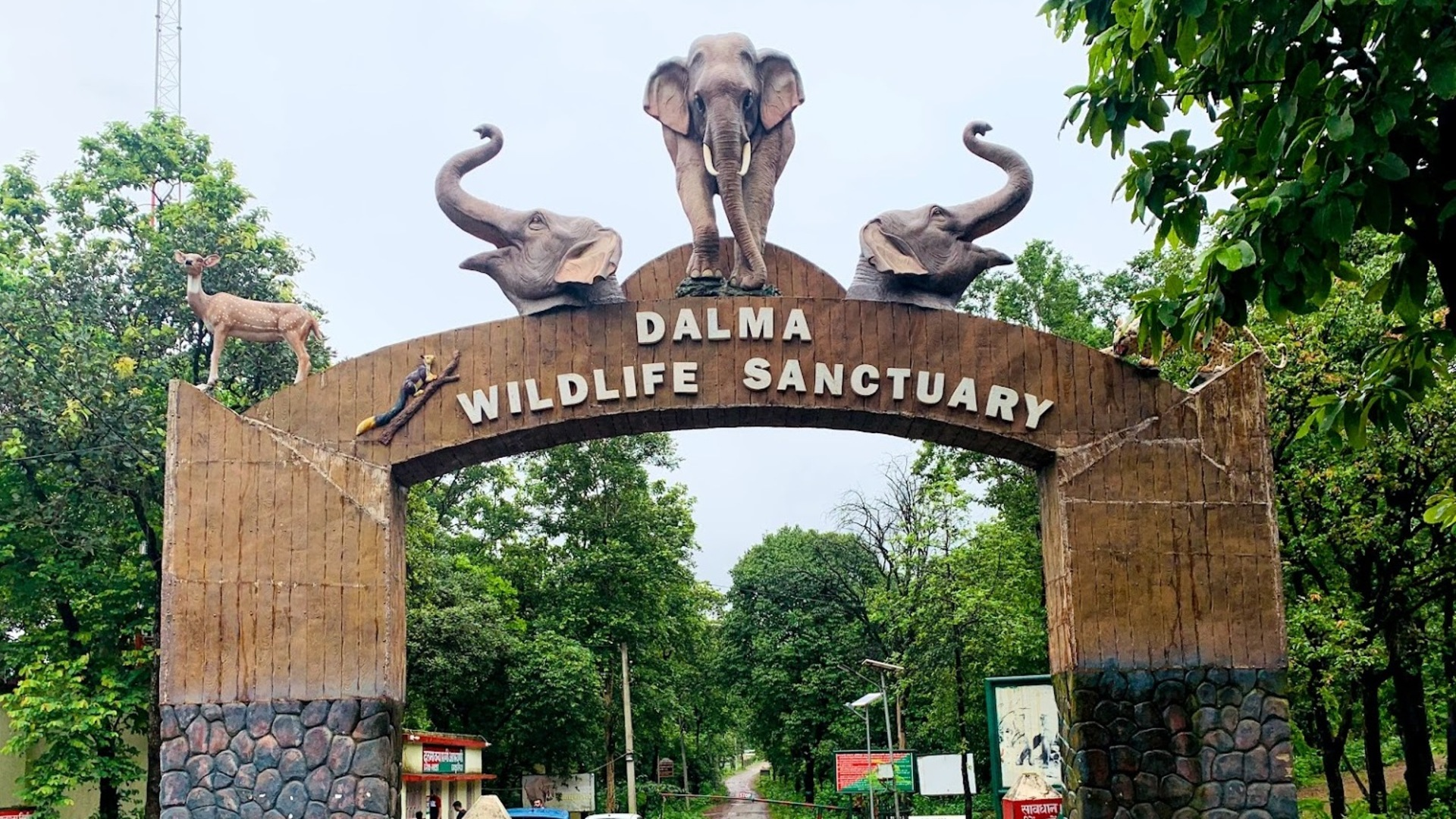
Entrance of Dalma Wildlife Sanctuary

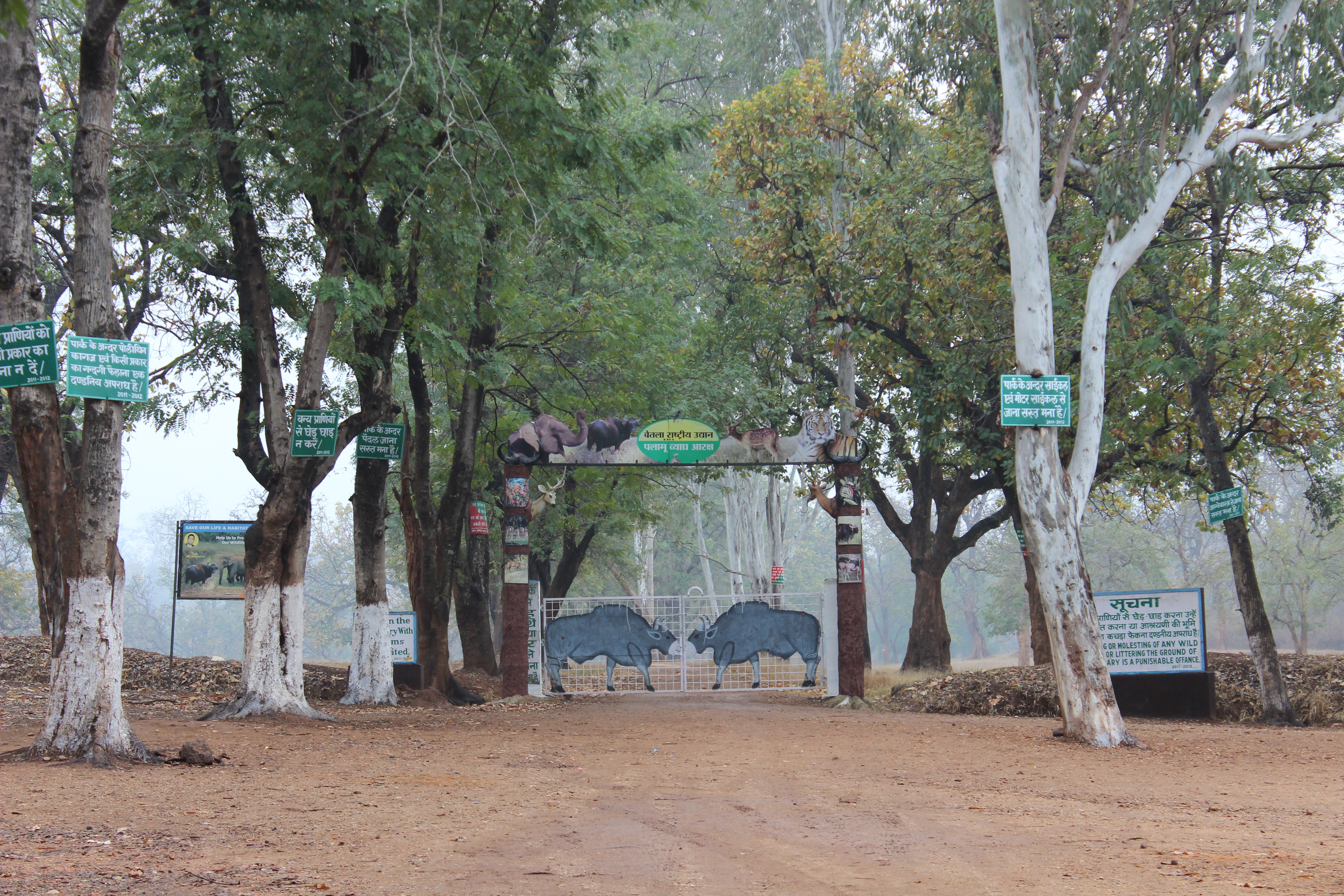
Entrance of Betla National Park

== Culture ==
The state of Jharkhand has rich and vibrant tradition. It is known for its local festival of Karam, Sohrai, Phagua, Tusu and Sarhul. There are several folk dance in State including Jhumair, Domkach, Chhau, Firkal and Mundari dance, which represent its ancient heritage.

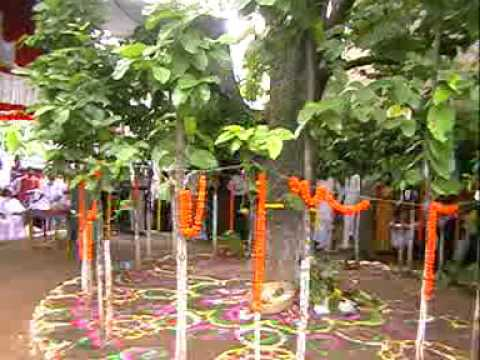
Karam festival in Jharkhand

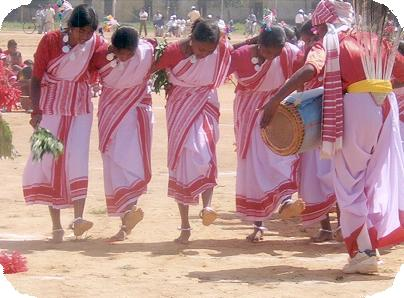
Sarhul dance in Jharkhand

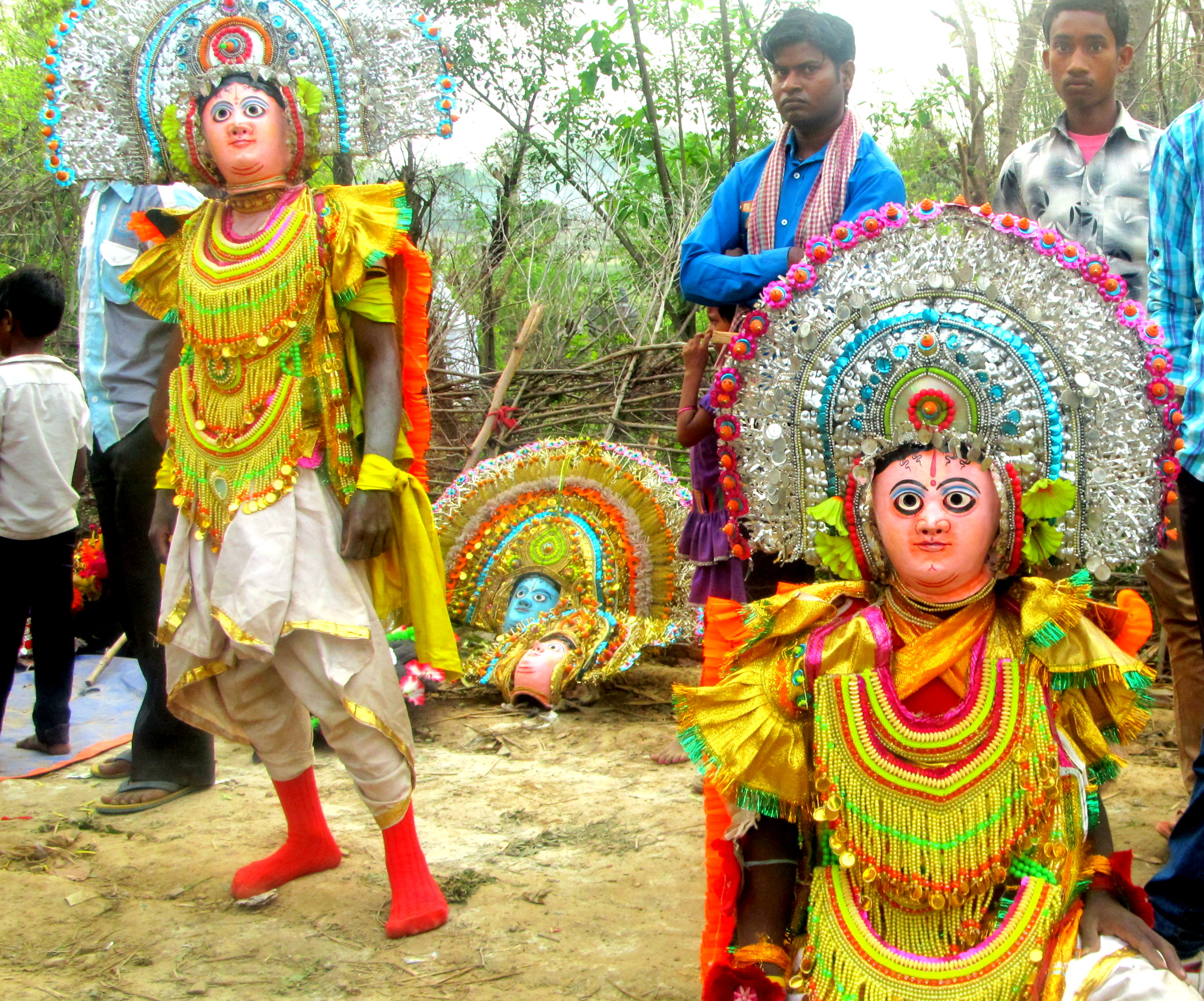
Chhau dancers in village of Jharkhand

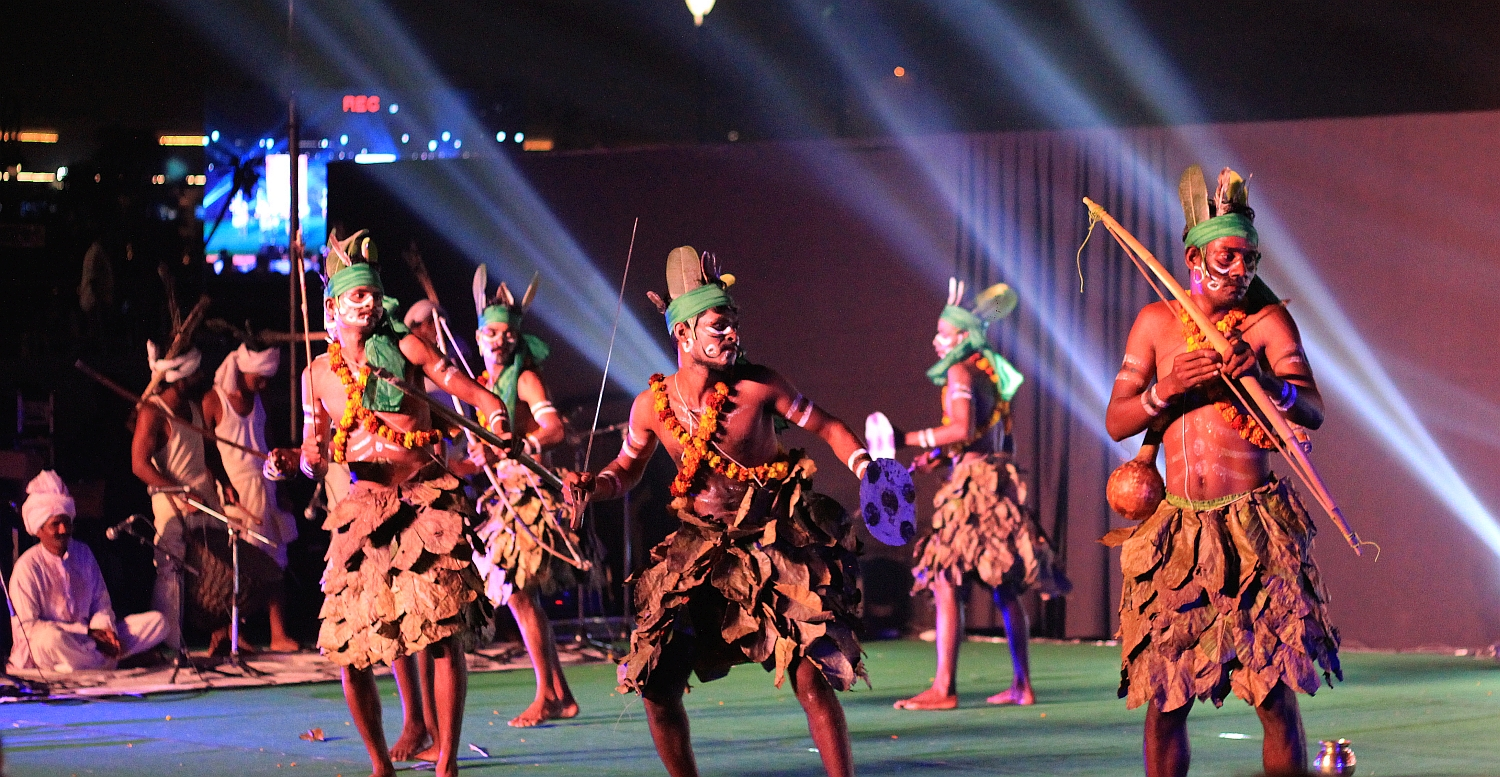
Firkal dancers of Jharkhand

Famous dishes of the state include Chhilka Roti, Malpua, Pitha, Dhooska, Arsa roti, Dudhauri, and Panipuri (Gupchup).

== Archaeological sites and heritage ==
There are several archaeological sites in state which are:

- Cave Paintings, Isko, Hazaribagh district
- Megalith Prehistoric Monument, Pakri Barwadih, Hazaribagh district
- Palamu Forts, Palamu district
- Maluti, Dumka district
- Navratangarh, Gumla district

== Mining Tourism ==
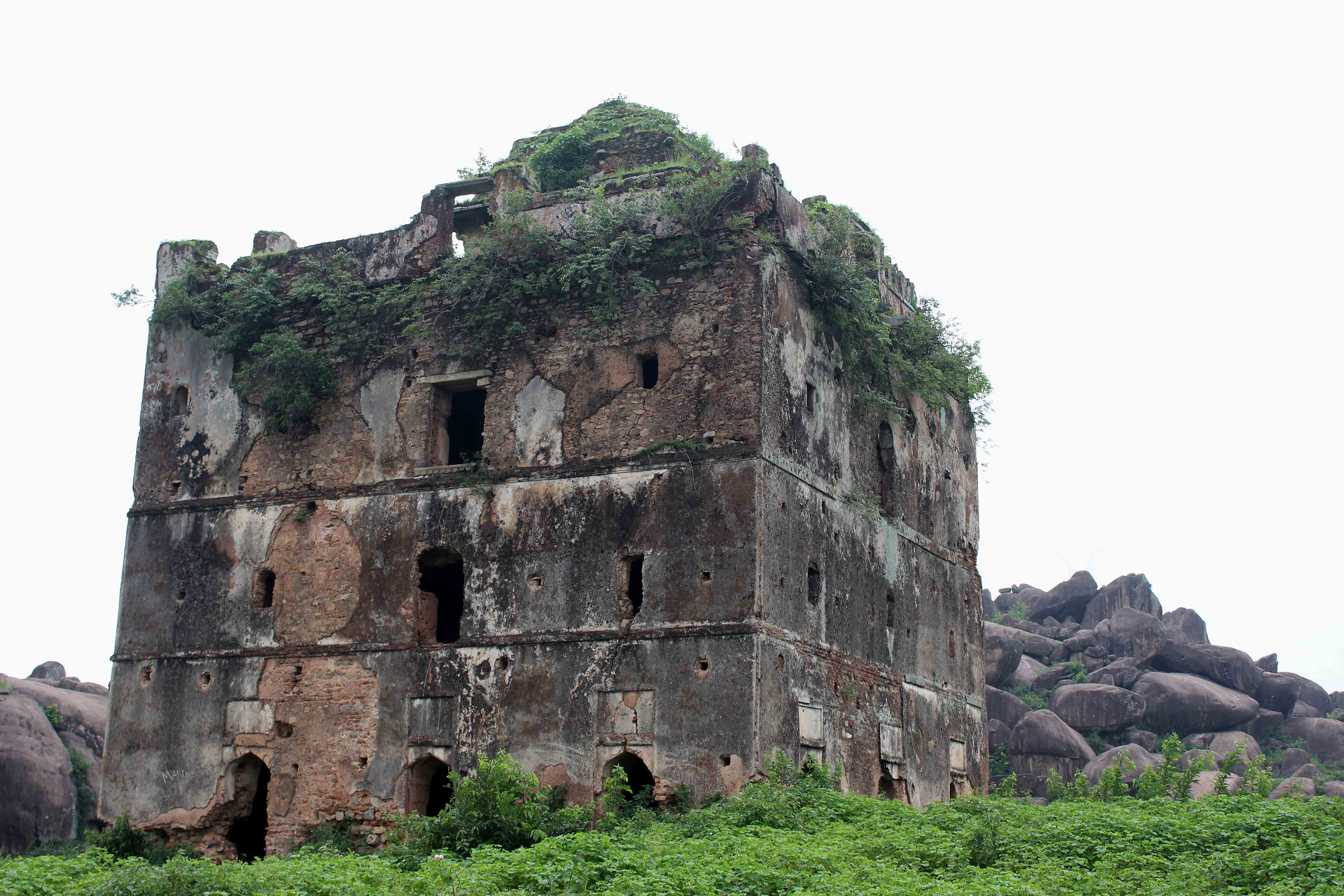
Navratangarh

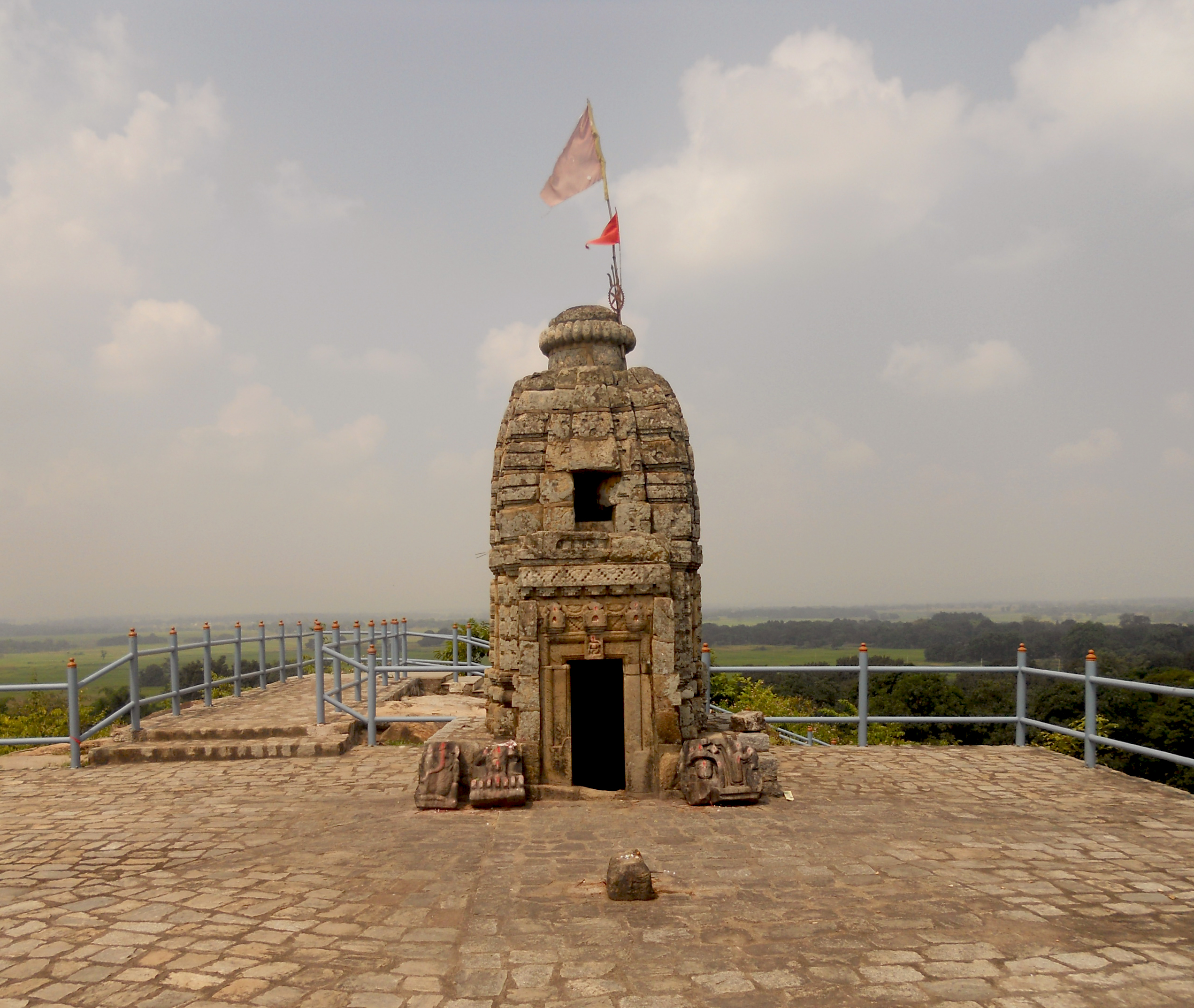
Khakparta Temple in Lohardaga district

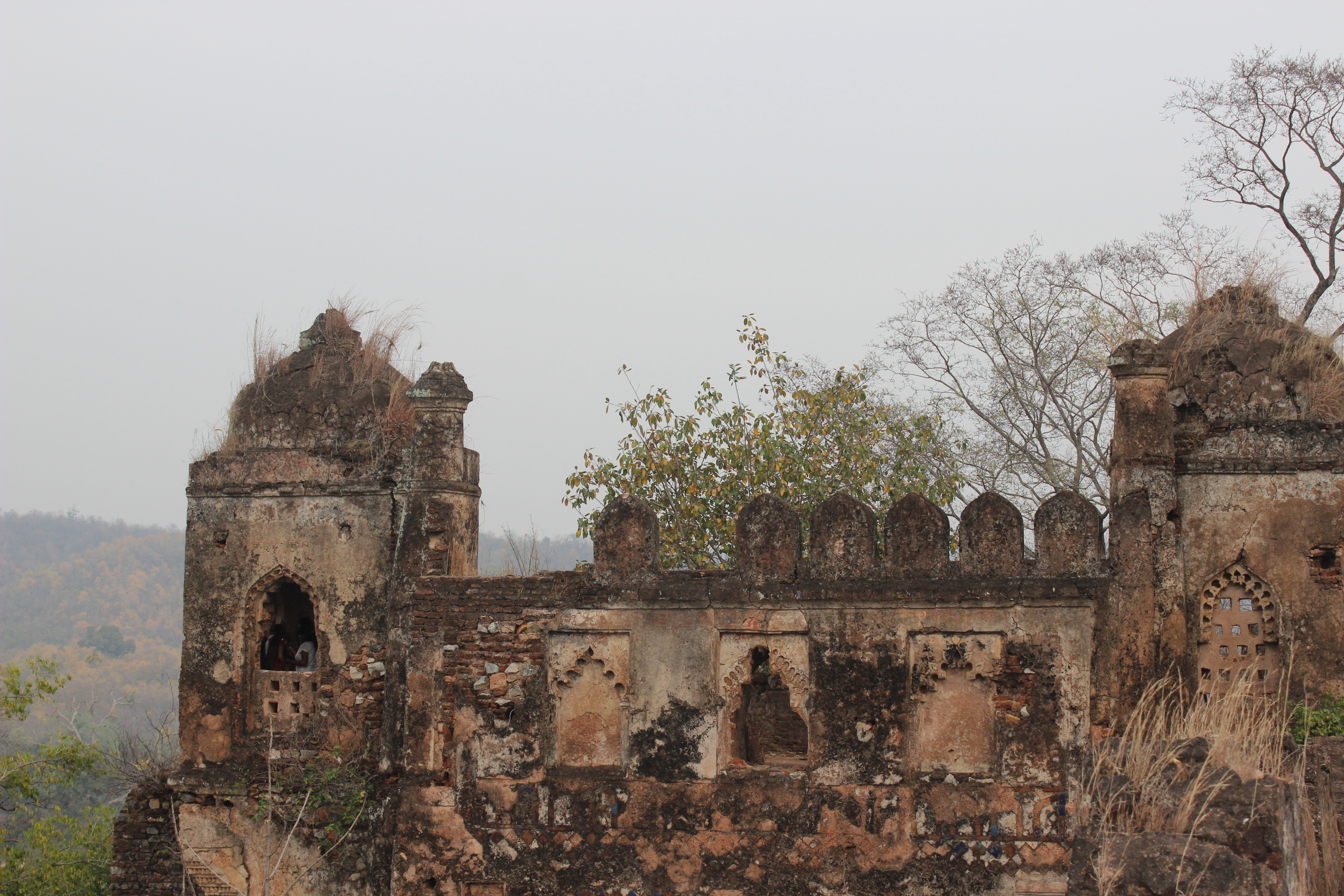
Palamu Forts

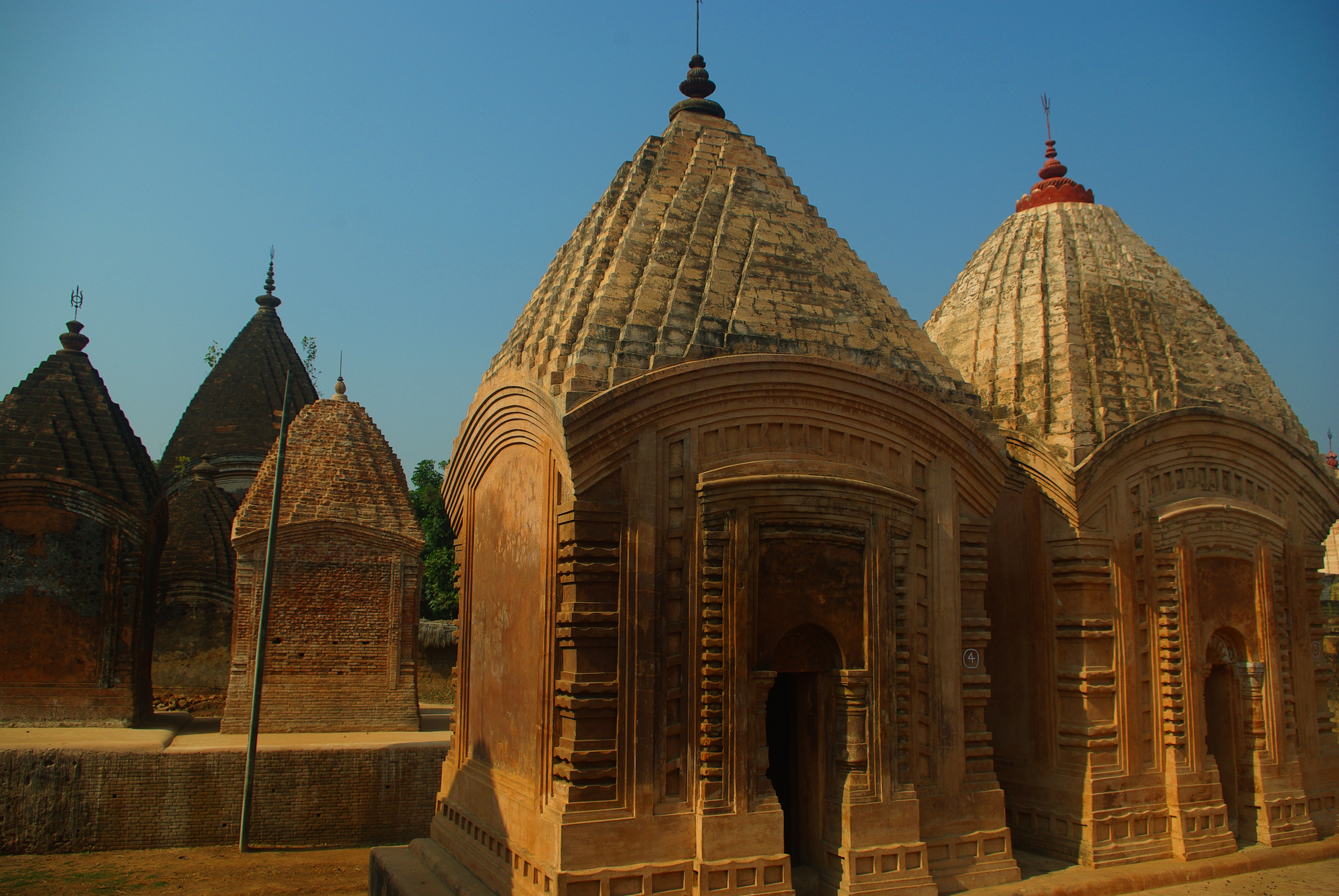
Maluti

In July 2025, the Jharkhand Tourism Development Corporation in collaboration with the Central Coalfields Limited launched 'Mines Tourism - Jharkhand'. The initiative has sought to showcase the State's industrial strength and simultaneously generate livelihood opportunities. The intiative kicked off with the North Unimari (Birsa) open-cast coal mine.

== Museums ==
There are several museums in State which have preserved ancient artifacts discovered from state such as Stone tools, terracotta and sculpture.

- Ranchi Science Centre, Ranchi
- State Museum Hotwar, Ranchi
- Tribal Research Institute and Museum, Ranchi
- Sanskriti Museum & Art Gallery, Hazaribagh

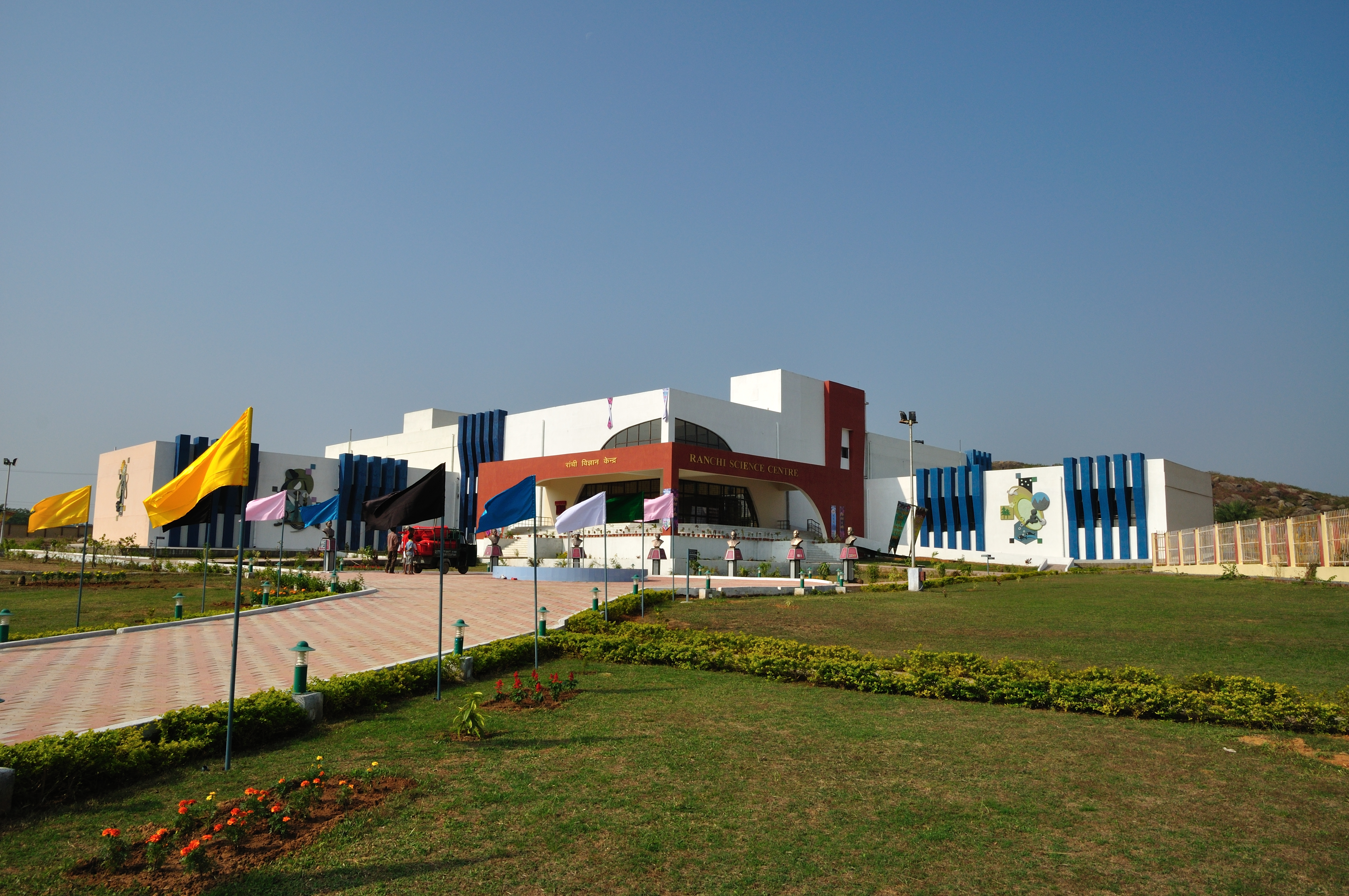
Ranchi Science Centre, Ranchi

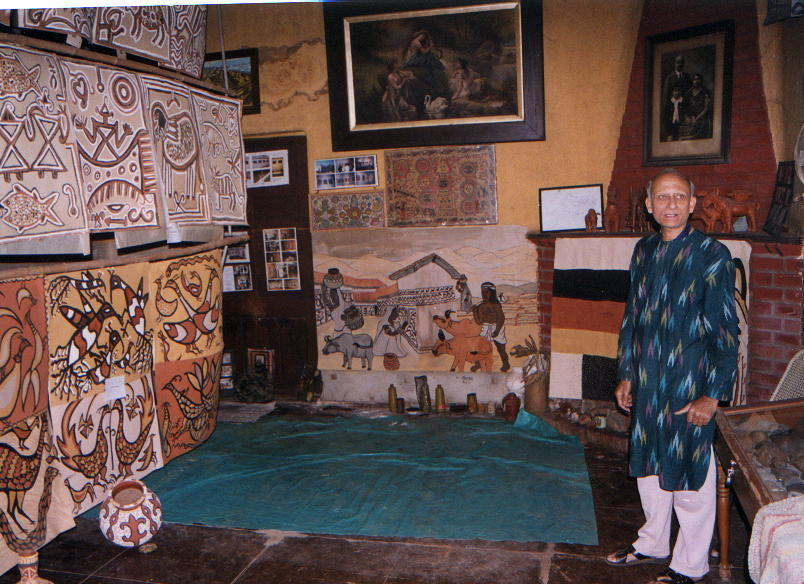
Sanskriti Museum & Art Gallery, Hazaribagh

== Gallery ==
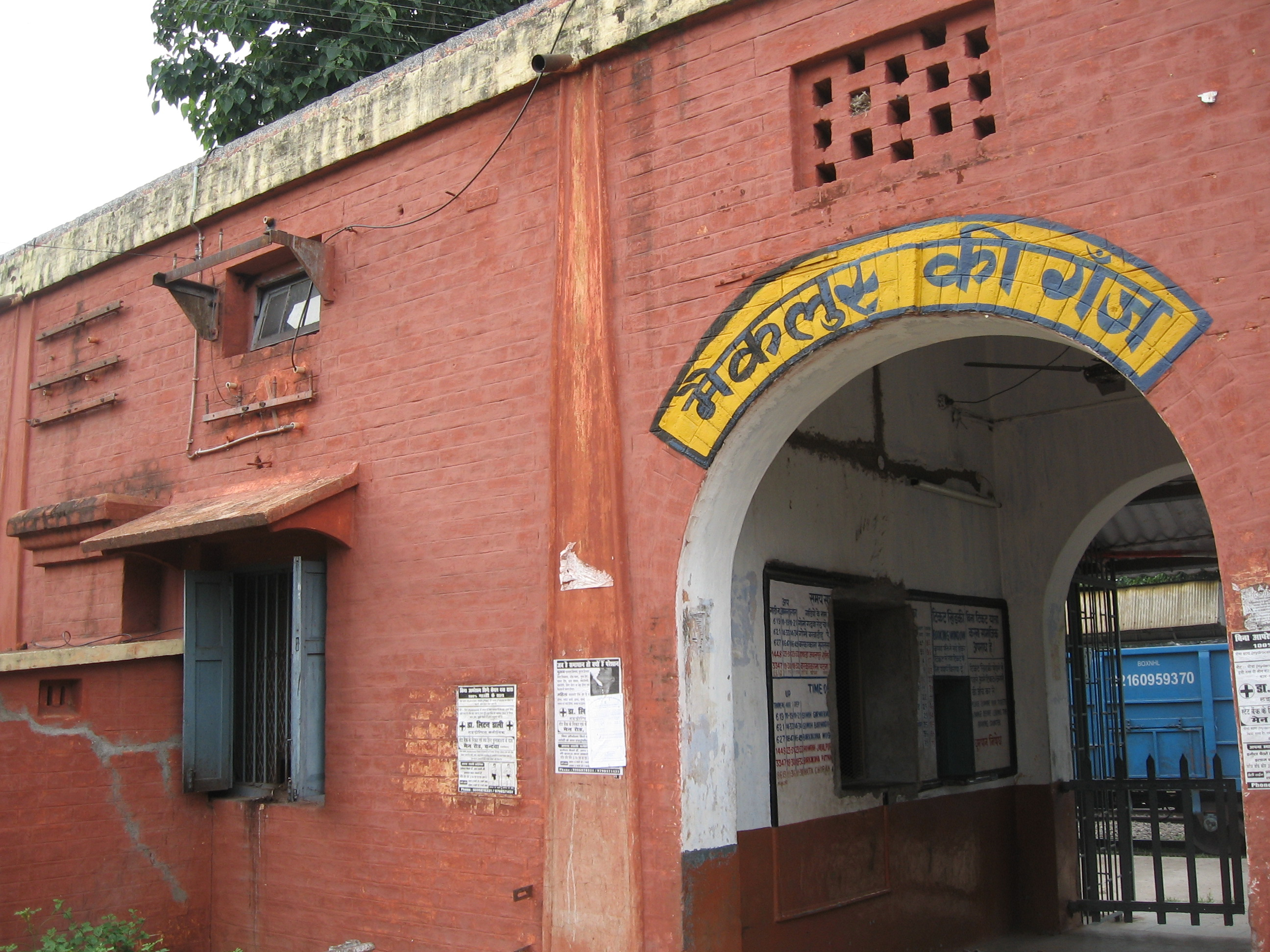
McCluskieganj

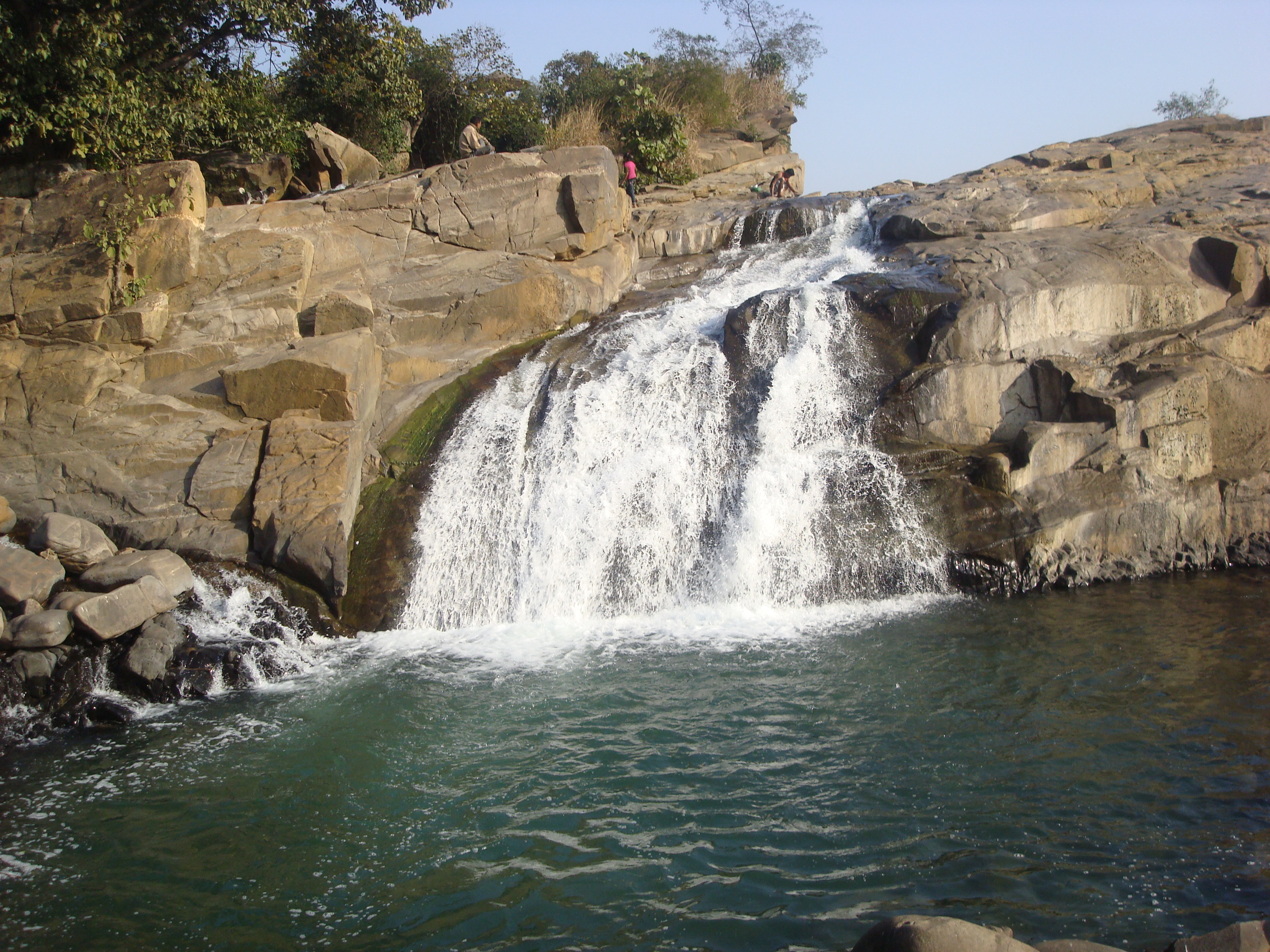
Usri Falls

== See also ==
- Government of Jharkhand
- Department of Tourism, Arts, Culture, Sports and Youth Affairs (Jharkhand)
- List of Monuments of National Importance in Jharkhand
