= Jharkhand Tourism Development Corporation =

Public sector undertaking

- Company type: Jharkhand Government Undertaking
- Industry: Tourism, Ecotourism, Hotel Management
- Founded: 22 March 2002
- Headquarters: Dhurwa, Ranchi, Jharkhand, India - 834004
- Area served: Jharkhand, India
- Key people: Sudivya Kumar (Minister for Tourism); Manoj Kumar, IAS (Secretary); Prem Ranjan, IAS (Managing Director)
- Owner: Department of Tourism, Arts, Culture, Sports and Youth Affairs, Government of Jharkhand
- Website: https://jtdcl.jharkhand.gov.in

Jharkhand Tourism Development Corporation Limited (JTDC) is a public sector undertaking under the Government of Jharkhand that promotes, develops, and regulates tourism in the Indian state of Jharkhand. The corporation operates guests, resorts, guesthouses, tourist complexes and information centres across the state and is also responsible for tourism infrastructure and promotional activities. JTDC functions under the Department of Tourism, Arts, Culture, Sports and Youth Affairs, Government of Jharkhand. Its registered office is located at Dhurwa, Ranchi.

== History ==
Jharkhand Tourism Development Corporation Limited (JTDC) was established in 2002 by the Government of Jharkhand as a public sector undertaking to promote tourism in the state.

Soon after its incorporation, several state-owned hotels, resorts, and tourist complexes were transferred to JTDC for operation and maintenance.

Over the years, JTDC has emerged as the nodal agency for implementing tourism development projects under successive state tourism policies, including the Jharkhand Tourism Policy 2021.

== Hotels and Lodges ==
JTDC manages hotels & guest houses in 9 locations across the state of Jharkhand :

Name	Location (Coordinate)	District	Photo	About Property	Tourist Attraction
Hotel Prabhat Vihar Deluxe	Netarhat (23.2825°N 84.1646°E)	Latehar		Located in Netarhat, also known as the "Queen of Chotanagpur" in Jharkhand.	Netarhat Hill Station
Hotel Van Vihar	Betla (23.5314°N 84.1129°E)	Latehar		Fully AC and non AC rooms equipped with well maintained private bathroom with proper bath amenities like geysor and colour LCD television.	Betla National Park, Palamu Fort (5 km) and Barwadih Shiv Mandir (13 km)
Hotel Sarovar Vihar	Patratu (23.6091343°N 85.2796420°E)	Ramgarh		AC bedrooms with complimentary breakfast and direct access to Patratu Lake	Scenic view of Patratu Lake, Patratu Valley & Waterfall
Hotel Parayatan Vihar	Patratu (23.6094028°N 85.2811213°E)	Ramgarh		Comfortable double bedrooms with modern amenities that include elegant halls for gathering and a multi-cuisine restaurant serving local delicacies	
Hotel Birsa Vihar	Ranchi (23.3521474°N 85.3247836°E)	Ranchi		24 elegantly appointed double-bed rooms and three luxurious suites, each designed to provide a unique stay experience	l
Hotel Natraj Vihar	Deoghar (24.4885597°N 86.6987382°E)	Deoghar		The hotel offers well-furnished air-conditioned and non-AC rooms, each featuring private balconies with serene views, attached bathrooms with geyser facilities, LCD televisions for entertainment.	
Hotel Baidyanath Vihar	Deoghar (24.4845773°N 86.6908498°E)	Deoghar		Well-furnished AC and non-AC rooms equipped with well-maintained private bathroom with proper bath amenities like Geyser and Colour LCD Television	Shivganga (2.2 km), Naulakha Mandir (3 km), Nandan Pahar (3kms), Tapovan (6kms), Ramakrishna Mission Vidyapith (3,7 km), Rikhiapeeth(9 km), Trikut Ropeway (16–17 km).
Hotel Ratan Vihar	Dhanbad (23.7960848°N 86.4335934°E)	Dhanbad		Well-maintained AC and non-AC rooms with attached bathrooms with geyser facilities	
Hotel Basuki Vihar	Basukinath (24.3957834°N 87.0861702°E)	Dumka		Well spacious AC and Non-AC rooms with basic facilities	Basukinath Shiva Temple and Massanjore Dam

== See also ==
- Government of Jharkhand
- Department of Tourism, Arts, Culture, Sports and Youth Affairs (Jharkhand)
- Tourism in Jharkhand
- Ministry of Tourism (India)
