= Department of Tourism, Arts, Culture, Sports and Youth Affairs (Jharkhand) =

State government department in Jharkhand, India

- पर्यटन, कला संस्कृति, खेलकूद एवं युवा कार्य विभाग

Department overview
- Jurisdiction: Government of Jharkhand
- Headquarters: FFP Building, Dhurwa, Ranchi, Jharkhand - 834004
- Minister responsible: Sudivya Kumar, Minister In Charge
- Department executive: Manoj Kumar, IAS, Secretary
- Child Department: Jharkhand Tourism Development Corporation (JTDCL)
- Website: Official Website

The Department of Tourism, Arts, Culture, Sports and Youth Affairs is a department under the Government of Jharkhand which is responsible for formulating and implementing policies related to tourism development, promotion of arts and culture, preservation of heritage and the encouragement of sports and youth-related activities in the state.

== Ministerial team ==
The ministerial team is headed by the cabinet minister of Government of Jharkhand. Civil servants such as the Principal Secretary are appointed to support the minister in managing the department and implementing its functions. Since December 2024, the minister for Department of Tourism, Arts, Culture, Sports and Youth Affairs is Sudivya Kumar.

== See also ==
- Government of Jharkhand
- Tourism in Jharkhand
- Jharkhand Tourism Development Corporation
- Ministry of Tourism (India)
- Rabindra Bhawan, Ranchi
