= Hazaribagh jheel =

Coordinates: 24.009°N 85.363°E

Hazaribagh jheel is a series of artificial lakes with seven parts all on different levels so that water spills over to the other lake through a spill channel. It conserves water and supplies to people living in Hazaribagh. It was constructed by the British in 1831 when they were building the central jail in Hazaribagh. Construction of the jail required huge amounts of clay, leaving four big craters which became lakes.

== Source ==
Official Website of Jharkhand government
