= List of villages in Khunti district =

Khunti district is one of the 24 districts of Jharkhand state, India. This is the list of villages of Khunti district according to respective 6 blocks.

== Arki (Erki) ==
List of villages in Arki block
Sl.	Name of panchayats	Name of villages
1.	Arki	Arki (Erki)
1.	Arki	Barubera
1.	Arki	Dhoba
1.	Arki	Gamharia
1.	Arki	Hurua
1.	Arki	Jojodih
1.	Arki	Lupunghatu
2.	Todang	Badani
2.	Todang	Bandugara
2.	Todang	Ganjudih
2.	Todang	Gitilbera
2.	Todang	Korwa
2.	Todang	Lebed
2.	Todang	Lobo
2.	Todang	Saumarangbera
2.	Todang	Sinjani
2.	Todang	Todang
3.	Tintila	Bagri
3.	Tintila	Baruhatu
3.	Tintila	Chatamhutub
3.	Tintila	Dolda
3.	Tintila	Dundupiri
3.	Tintila	Kharwatorang
3.	Tintila	Koa
3.	Tintila	Ragonoe
3.	Tintila	Raytorang
3.	Tintila	Romba
3.	Tintila	Tarbera
3.	Tintila	Tintila
4.	Sindri	Balamda
4.	Sindri	Bandu
4.	Sindri	Piskahatu
4.	Sindri	Piskatoli
4.	Sindri	Sindri
4.	Sindri	Sirkadih
4.	Sindri	Tetebandu
5.	Purnanagar	Banribera
5.	Purnanagar	Berapara
5.	Purnanagar	Doriya
5.	Purnanagar	Kapariya
5.	Purnanagar	Pitupara
5.	Purnanagar	Purnanagar
5.	Purnanagar	Tulsidih
6.	Sargeya	Barigara
6.	Sargeya	Kota
6.	Sargeya	Maipa
6.	Sargeya	Sargeya
6.	Sargeya	Telengadih
7.	Barinijkel	Barinijkel
7.	Barinijkel	Charadih
7.	Barinijkel	Gerne
7.	Barinijkel	Haramsereng
7.	Barinijkel	Koil
7.	Barinijkel	Mailpiri
7.	Barinijkel	Marangburu
7.	Barinijkel	Sareyad
7.	Barinijkel	Selda
7.	Barinijkel	Ulihatu
8.	Upar Balalong	Berahatu
8.	Upar Balalong	Chainpur
8.	Upar Balalong	Chirudih
8.	Upar Balalong	Gurbera
8.	Upar Balalong	Heth Balalong
8.	Upar Balalong	Jojohatu
8.	Upar Balalong	Pandudih
8.	Upar Balalong	Sigid
8.	Upar Balalong	Tekniyan
8.	Upar Balalong	Upar Balalong
8.	Upar Balalong	Upar Ganjhari
9.	Birbanki	Birbanki
9.	Birbanki	Chuklu
9.	Birbanki	Ghaghra
10.	Tirla	Birsorra
10.	Tirla	Chaipi
10.	Tirla	Chondordih
10.	Tirla	Gomiburu
10.	Tirla	Haralma
10.	Tirla	Japud
10.	Tirla	Kadaldih
10.	Tirla	Kander
10.	Tirla	Kulburu
10.	Tirla	Sobradih
10.	Tirla	Taiba
10.	Tirla	Tirla
10.	Tirla	Tubil
10.	Tirla	Tuyugutu
11.	Bohonda	Bohonda
11.	Bohonda	Kurunga
11.	Bohonda	Rokab
11.	Bohonda	Sake
11.	Bohonda	Totkorakudada
12.	Madhatu	Chalkad
12.	Madhatu	Katui
12.	Madhatu	Madhatu
12.	Madhatu	Muchia
12.	Madhatu	Parasu
13.	Nourhi	Dewridih
13.	Nourhi	Kujiamba
13.	Nourhi	Norhi
13.	Nourhi	Purtu
13.	Nourhi	Rangamati
13.	Nourhi	Tobla Busudih
14.	Sosokuti	Dundi
14.	Sosokuti	Gorahapa
14.	Sosokuti	Jaranga
14.	Sosokuti	Jorko
14.	Sosokuti	Kesaribera
14.	Sosokuti	Masanga
14.	Sosokuti	Sonpur
14.	Sosokuti	Sosokuti
15.	Hunth	Gontura
15.	Hunth	Hemram
15.	Hunth	Hunth
15.	Hunth	Rumchu
15.	Hunth	Serenghatu
16.	Kochang	Kasmar
16.	Kochang	Kochang
16.	Kochang	Kuri
16.	Kochang	Longa
16.	Kochang	Naranga
16.	Kochang	Sayadba
16.	Kochang	Sinjuri
16.	Kochang	Tuntu
16.	Kochang	Tusunga
16.	Kochang	Tutui

== Karra ==
List of villages in Karra block
Sl.	Name of panchayats	Name of villages
1.	Jurdag	Amjora
1.	Jurdag	Bichagara
1.	Jurdag	Ganaloya
1.	Jurdag	Jaltanda
1.	Jurdag	Jurdag
1.	Jurdag	Pargaon
1.	Jurdag	Tulu
1.	Jurdag	Tungaon
2.	Dahkela	Anro Toli
2.	Dahkela	Barwadag
2.	Dahkela	Dahkela
2.	Dahkela	Jorko
2.	Dahkela	Kotlo
2.	Dahkela	Masko
2.	Dahkela	Runju
2.	Dahkela	Sarlo
2.	Dahkela	Tilma
3.	Sungi	Asanmanri
3.	Sungi	Bala
3.	Sungi	Jone
3.	Sungi	Ludru
3.	Sungi	Pora
3.	Sungi	Sungi
3.	Sungi	Tikki
4.	Hakajang	Ata
4.	Hakajang	Bankuli
4.	Hakajang	Barango
4.	Hakajang	Galalong
4.	Hakajang	Guyu
4.	Hakajang	Hakajang
4.	Hakajang	Jiputoli
4.	Hakajang	Mutpa
4.	Hakajang	Padamapur
4.	Hakajang	Ronhi
4.	Hakajang	Sarambel
4.	Hakajang	Sarwadag
4.	Hakajang	Silapat
5.	Bakaspur	Bakaspur
5.	Bakaspur	Barka Regre
5.	Bakaspur	Chhotka Regre
5.	Bakaspur	Gari
5.	Bakaspur	Lappa
6.	Bamarja	Bamarja
6.	Bamarja	Baragain
6.	Bamarja	Diuri
6.	Bamarja	Pahar Toli
6.	Bamarja	Palsa
6.	Bamarja	Sangor
6.	Bamarja	Sardulla
6.	Bamarja	Siankel
6.	Bamarja	Timra
7.	Jaria	Bamhan Toli
7.	Jaria	Churle
7.	Jaria	Hochor
7.	Jaria	Jaria
7.	Jaria	Kuda Toli
7.	Jaria	Muruchkel
7.	Jaria	Nagra
8.	Kachabari	Bandu
8.	Kachabari	Barigara
8.	Kachabari	Bhagalputjulijula
8.	Kachabari	Bingaon
8.	Kachabari	Chandapara
8.	Kachabari	Chiur
8.	Kachabari	Darangkel
8.	Kachabari	Hesla
8.	Kachabari	Kachabari
8.	Kachabari	Patra Toli
8.	Kachabari	Tumna
9.	Chhata	Belsiring
9.	Chhata	Chhata
9.	Chhata	Galiondar
9.	Chhata	Goso
9.	Chhata	Kedu
9.	Chhata	Korkotakadal
9.	Chhata	Kurse
9.	Chhata	Pandra
9.	Chhata	Saura
9.	Chhata	Setahuru
10.	Urikel	Bhusur
10.	Urikel	Bikuadag
10.	Urikel	Ethe
10.	Urikel	Gara Toli
10.	Urikel	Jamhar
10.	Urikel	Jojodag
10.	Urikel	Kasira
10.	Urikel	Kurid
10.	Urikel	Mitkora
10.	Urikel	Nidhia
10.	Urikel	Urikel
11.	Dumargadi	Birda
11.	Dumargadi	Burhiroma
11.	Dumargadi	Duphu
11.	Dumargadi	Dumargadi
11.	Dumargadi	Gungunian
11.	Dumargadi	Hisri
11.	Dumargadi	Jerga
11.	Dumargadi	Jhapra
11.	Dumargadi	Manpur
11.	Dumargadi	Sahilong
11.	Dumargadi	Silma
11.	Dumargadi	Taski
12.	Larta	Burka
12.	Larta	Chorpinda
12.	Larta	Jaltanra
12.	Larta	Kanti
12.	Larta	Larta
12.	Larta	Madhukama
12.	Larta	Merle
12.	Larta	Silafari
12.	Larta	Suari
13.	Kudlum	Chaldanru
13.	Kudlum	Chorwadag
13.	Kudlum	Dhanamunji
13.	Kudlum	Digadon
13.	Kudlum	Erahatu
13.	Kudlum	Ethe Toli
13.	Kudlum	Haruhapa
13.	Kudlum	Kudlum
13.	Kudlum	Muchiakalang
13.	Kudlum	Patramuchia
13.	Kudlum	Sonmer
14.	Lodhma	Changa Toli
14.	Lodhma	Kansili
14.	Lodhma	Katamkuku
14.	Lodhma	Kulhutu
14.	Lodhma	Lodhma
14.	Lodhma	Lohagara
14.	Lodhma	Murhu
14.	Lodhma	Tiga
15.	Limra	Chanho
15.	Limra	Chiddi
15.	Limra	Deswali
15.	Limra	Dumari
15.	Limra	Gumru
15.	Limra	Hutub
15.	Limra	Katsimla
15.	Limra	Konahapa
15.	Limra	Limra
15.	Limra	Samundra
15.	Limra	Soteya
15.	Limra	Tirla
16.	Ghunsuli	Chanpi
16.	Ghunsuli	Dari
16.	Ghunsuli	Ghasibari
16.	Ghunsuli	Ghunsuli
16.	Ghunsuli	Guni
16.	Ghunsuli	Sirka
17.	Karra	Ganrke
17.	Karra	Hasibera
17.	Karra	Karra
17.	Karra	Kosambi
17.	Karra	Kudda
17.	Karra	Loyongkel
17.	Karra	Masmani
17.	Karra	Urikel Chhotka
18.	Gobindpur	Gobindpur
18.	Gobindpur	Gusa Toli
18.	Gobindpur	Jalanga
18.	Gobindpur	Rehargara
19.	Mehan	Kone
19.	Mehan	Lota
19.	Mehan	Malgo
19.	Mehan	Mehan
19.	Mehan	Rolagutu
19.	Mehan	Ronhe
19.	Mehan	Tapingsara
19.	Mehan	Tunel

== Khunti ==
List of villages in Khunti block
Sl.	Name of panchayats	Name of villages
1.	Murhi	Akta
1.	Murhi	Anidih
1.	Murhi	Bandhtoli
1.	Murhi	Bara Banri
1.	Murhi	Bara Baru
1.	Murhi	Barkargi
1.	Murhi	Chhota Banri
1.	Murhi	Chhota Baru
1.	Murhi	Dabgana
1.	Murhi	Dundidih
1.	Murhi	Fakra
1.	Murhi	Hatudami
1.	Murhi	Hesang
1.	Murhi	Hurlung
1.	Murhi	Kanki
1.	Murhi	Kurkutiya
1.	Murhi	Murhi
1.	Murhi	Teram
2.	Siladon	Alaundi
2.	Siladon	Barudih
2.	Siladon	Chitramu
2.	Siladon	Chukru
2.	Siladon	Ganeor
2.	Siladon	Irud
2.	Siladon	Jiki
2.	Siladon	Karge
2.	Siladon	Kumkuma
2.	Siladon	Latarjang
2.	Siladon	Patibera
2.	Siladon	Patimgara
2.	Siladon	Rabangdag
2.	Siladon	Remta
2.	Siladon	Sodag
2.	Siladon	Sulhe
2.	Siladon	Taro
3.	Barudih	Anigara
3.	Barudih	Chalam
3.	Barudih	Chalmbartol
3.	Barudih	Dargama
3.	Barudih	Jikilata
3.	Barudih	Poseya
4.	Fudi	Argori
4.	Fudi	Dandaul
4.	Fudi	Dungra
4.	Fudi	Kalamati
4.	Fudi	Nehaldih
4.	Fudi	Phuddi
4.	Fudi	Rai
4.	Fudi	Silda
5.	Tirla	Bagru
5.	Tirla	Belahathi
5.	Tirla	Budhudih
5.	Tirla	Eranda
5.	Tirla	Saradkel
5.	Tirla	Sesotoli
5.	Tirla	Simbhukel
5.	Tirla	Tirla
5.	Tirla	Torangkel
6.	Landup	Bandih
6.	Landup	Bichagutu
6.	Landup	Bokrahisa
6.	Landup	Buruhatu
6.	Landup	Chandor
6.	Landup	Dulmi
6.	Landup	Jojohatu
6.	Landup	Jonodih
6.	Landup	Karetumbi
6.	Landup	Katud
6.	Landup	Kerra
6.	Landup	Landup
6.	Landup	Lotor
6.	Landup	Nachitola
6.	Landup	Patratoli
6.	Landup	Pirihatu
6.	Landup	Rangrum
6.	Landup	Sirum
6.	Landup	Utrung
7.	Dadigutu	Bara Sarle
7.	Dadigutu	Bongamad
7.	Dadigutu	Burhadih
7.	Dadigutu	Burudih
7.	Dadigutu	Chhota Sarle
7.	Dadigutu	Chinchal
7.	Dadigutu	Darigutu
7.	Dadigutu	Dewo
7.	Dadigutu	Dulli
7.	Dadigutu	Garamara
7.	Dadigutu	Habudih
7.	Dadigutu	Hendeba
7.	Dadigutu	Jordag
7.	Dadigutu	Kenduasokra
7.	Dadigutu	Kurkuta
7.	Dadigutu	Labodag
7.	Dadigutu	Lamlum
7.	Dadigutu	Salgadih
7.	Dadigutu	Sukandih
7.	Dadigutu	Totada
8.	Bhandra	Barbanda
8.	Bhandra	Bhanrra
8.	Bhandra	Chamri
8.	Bhandra	Chikor
8.	Bhandra	Dokar
8.	Bhandra	Hesahatu
8.	Bhandra	Jamri
8.	Bhandra	Jilinga
8.	Bhandra	Ondra
9.	Tilma	Bariloyong
9.	Tilma	Dangiadag
9.	Tilma	Hakadua
9.	Tilma	Hating Chauli
9.	Tilma	Karora
9.	Tilma	Kujram
9.	Tilma	Latarhatu
9.	Tilma	Omto
9.	Tilma	Putidag
9.	Tilma	Sandasom
9.	Tilma	Tarub
9.	Tilma	Tilma
10.	Gutjora	Belangi
10.	Gutjora	Chalangi
10.	Gutjora	Dugdugiya
10.	Gutjora	Ghaghra
10.	Gutjora	Gutjora
10.	Gutjora	Hutar
10.	Gutjora	Jiarapa
10.	Gutjora	Kanadih
10.	Gutjora	Kapariya
10.	Gutjora	Khijuri
11.	Birhu	Belwadag
11.	Birhu	Birhu
11.	Birhu	Chiruhatu
11.	Birhu	Dunardaga
11.	Birhu	Idri
11.	Birhu	Manhu
11.	Birhu	Rewa
11.	Birhu	Siladon
12.	Maranghada	Bhut
12.	Maranghada	Gargaon
12.	Maranghada	Maranghada
12.	Maranghada	Maranghatu
12.	Maranghada	Sarjama
12.	Maranghada	Senegutu
12.	Maranghada	Setagara
12.	Maranghada	Sukrisereng

== Torpa ==
List of villages in Torpa block
Sl.	Name of panchayats	Name of villages
1.	Amma	Amma
1.	Amma	Chukru
1.	Amma	Ermere
1.	Amma	Kanakloiya
1.	Amma	Kulda
1.	Amma	Pakna
1.	Amma	Satal
1.	Amma	Roykera
1.	Amma	Urma
2.	Okra	Angarabari
2.	Okra	Japud
2.	Okra	Okra
2.	Okra	Pandra
2.	Okra	Roro
2.	Okra	Saradkel
3.	Marcha	Banabira
3.	Marcha	Karra
3.	Marcha	Marcha
3.	Marcha	Turigara
4.	Diyankel	Bandu
4.	Diyankel	Churgi
4.	Diyankel	Diyankel
4.	Diyankel	Guphu
4.	Diyankel	Hotor
4.	Diyankel	Keyondtoli
4.	Diyankel	Mamaria
4.	Diyankel	Manhatu
4.	Diyankel	Paira
4.	Diyankel	Panrriya
4.	Diyankel	Patratoli
4.	Diyankel	Patrauyur
4.	Diyankel	Ramjay
4.	Diyankel	Ubka
5.	Kamra	Barda
5.	Kamra	Baski
5.	Kamra	Birta
5.	Kamra	Digri
5.	Kamra	Kamra
6.	Barkuli	Barkuli
6.	Barkuli	Jagu
6.	Barkuli	Jari
6.	Barkuli	Jhatnitola
6.	Barkuli	Kajurda
6.	Barkuli	Kasmar
6.	Barkuli	Kuari
6.	Barkuli	Maladon
6.	Barkuli	Manmani
6.	Barkuli	Raisimla
7.	Dorma	Botlo
7.	Dorma	Burka
7.	Dorma	Chakla
7.	Dorma	Chandarpur
7.	Dorma	Dorma
7.	Dorma	Konharatoli
7.	Dorma	Sarangloya
7.	Dorma	Uyur
8.	Ukrimari	Budu
8.	Ukrimari	Dhobisoso
8.	Ukrimari	Garganj
8.	Ukrimari	Girung
8.	Ukrimari	Icha
8.	Ukrimari	Jogisoso
8.	Ukrimari	Tati
8.	Ukrimari	Ukrimanri
9.	Tapkara	Champabaha
9.	Tapkara	Kocha
9.	Tapkara	Tapkara
10.	Fatka	Derang
10.	Fatka	Dumangdiri
10.	Fatka	Gutuhatu
10.	Fatka	Kalet
10.	Fatka	Lohajimi
10.	Fatka	Phatka
11.	Sundari	Gerendabaroli
11.	Sundari	Guriya
11.	Sundari	Kokeya
11.	Sundari	Korla
11.	Sundari	Rirung
11.	Sundari	Sundari
12.	Husir	Gopla
12.	Husir	Husir
12.	Husir	Komang
12.	Husir	Latauli
12.	Husir	Ronhe
13.	Jaria	Jaria
13.	Jaria	Nawatoli
13.	Jaria	Patpur
13.	Jaria	Sonpurgarh
13.	Jaria	Tirla
14.	Urikela	Jibilong
14.	Urikela	Kherkhai
14.	Urikela	Nichitpur
14.	Urikela	Ulihatu
14.	Urikela	Urikel
15.	Torpa East	Torpa

== Rania ==
List of villages in Rania block
Sl.	Name of panchayats	Name of villages
1.	Jaipur	Balankel
1.	Jaipur	Bandapari
1.	Jaipur	Birhorchua
1.	Jaipur	Chengre
1.	Jaipur	Garhsidam
1.	Jaipur	Gorahatu
1.	Jaipur	Jaipur
1.	Jaipur	Kelo
1.	Jaipur	Khudibir
1.	Jaipur	Japut
1.	Jaipur	Kishunpur
1.	Jaipur	Orengtoli
1.	Jaipur	Pirul
1.	Jaipur	Talda
2.	Banai	Banai
2.	Banai	Dembukel
2.	Banai	Doengar
2.	Banai	Gondra
2.	Banai	Itam
2.	Banai	Jarakel
2.	Banai	Koinara
2.	Banai	Lohagara
2.	Banai	Manhatu
3.	Sode	Baring
3.	Sode	Barjo
3.	Sode	Beghima
3.	Sode	Boroy
3.	Sode	Gair
3.	Sode	Gopila
3.	Sode	Sauriuli
3.	Sode	Sode
3.	Sode	Tetari
3.	Sode	Tutikel
4.	Khatkhura	Belkidura
4.	Khatkhura	Chalgida
4.	Khatkhura	Kainbanki
4.	Khatkhura	Karkel
4.	Khatkhura	Khatkhura
5.	Tamba	Belsiyangarh
5.	Tamba	Harasuku
5.	Tamba	Hututua
5.	Tamba	Jalmadi
5.	Tamba	Kulap
5.	Tamba	Rania
5.	Tamba	Samorleta
5.	Tamba	Sarbo
5.	Tamba	Tamba
6.	Dahu	Dahu
6.	Dahu	Goharam
6.	Dahu	Golkera
6.	Dahu	Gorsod
6.	Dahu	Kotanger
6.	Dahu	Merambir
6.	Dahu	Pesam
6.	Dahu	Simartoli
6.	Dahu	Tumbukel
6.	Dahu	Ulung
7.	Khatanga	Digri
7.	Khatanga	Garai
7.	Khatanga	Khatanga
7.	Khatanga	Korakel
7.	Khatanga	Kulhai
7.	Khatanga	Sidam
7.	Khatanga	Tangarkela
7.	Khatanga	Token

== See also ==
- Lists of villages in Jharkhand
