= Perwaghagh Falls =

- Location within Jharkhand Location within India
- Location: Fatka panchayat, Torpa block, Khunti district, Jharkhand, India
- Coordinates: 22.835602°N 85.164646°E
- Watercourse: Chata River

Perwaghagh Falls is a waterfall with clear water flow on Chata River in the Fatka panchayat of Torpa block in Khunti district in the Indian state of Jharkhand.

== Etymology ==
The word “perwa” means pigeon and “ghagh“ means home which depicts the “House of Pigeons” inside the waterfall. Many still believe that these pigeons live inside the waterfall.

== Geography ==
Cities, towns and locations in Khunti district in South Chotanagpur Division
M: municipality, CT: census town, R: rural/ urban centre, T: tourist centre
Owing to space constraints in the small map, the actual locations in a larger map may vary slightly

=== Location ===
Perwaghagh Falls is located at 23.835602°N 85.164646°E.

It is located 40 km from Khunti. The road to the falls is through a forested area with a glimpse of hills. However, the visitor has to walk some distance to reach the falls, because of the rough terrain.

=== Area overview ===
In the adjacent map the area shown is “undulating and covered with hills, hillocks and jungles (jungles/ forests are shown as shaded area in the map). The soil of the area is rocky, sandy and red loam upland. There are paddy fields only in the depressions. It has a gentle slope adjacent to the streams.” A major part of the district is in the elevation range of 500–700 metres (1,600–2,300 ft), with up to ± 200 m for some parts. In 2011, it had a density of population of 210 persons per km^{2}. Khunti is an overwhelmingly rural district with 91.5% of the population living in rural areas. Famous places in this area are Ulihatu, the birthplace of Bhagwan Birsa Munda, and Dombari Buru, the central point of his activity.

Note: The map alongside presents some of the notable locations in the district. All places marked in the map are linked in the larger full screen map.

== Picnic spot ==
Endowed with scenic surroundings, Perwaghagh Falls is a popular picnic spot. Small row boats are available for joy rides around the place.

== See also ==
- List of waterfalls in India
- List of waterfalls in India by height
- Ranchi travel guide from Wikivoyage
