= Ganeor =

- Village
- Location in Jharkhand, India Ganeor (India)
- Coordinates: 23.1564949°N 85.3768526°E
- Country: India
- State: Jharkhand
- District: Khunti
- Elevation: 675 m (2,215 ft)

Population (2001)
  - Total: 15,400

Languages
  - Official: Hindi
- Time zone: UTC+5:30 (IST)
- Postal code: 835227
- Telephone code: 06528
- Vehicle registration: JH
- Sex Ratio: 1094:1000 ♂/♀

Ganeor is a small Village/hamlet in Khunti Block in Khunti District of Jharkhand State, India. It comes under Ganeor Panchayath. It is located south of District headquarters Khunti and 35 km from State capital Ranchi.

== Physiography ==
Ganeor is surrounded by Murhu Block towards South, Karra Block towards west, Bandgaon Block towards South, Torpa Block towards west. Khunti, Ranchi, Barughutu are Chakradharpur are the nearby cities to Ganeor.

== Geography ==
Ganeor is geographically rich as on the north east lies a pair small Mountains known as "Bhalki pahad". North is surrounded by large Precambrian rocks which are said to be abode of Tigers known as "Bagh Lata".

== Demographics ==
Hindi is the local language in Ganeor.

== Transport ==
=== Rail ===
There is no railway station near to Ganeor in less than 10 km. However Hatia railway station is major railway station 29 km near to Ganeor.

=== Roadways ===
Roads connecting major cities are providing movement for passenger and freight traffic. There is a district road connecting Torpa, Murhu, Govindpur, Khunti and Ranchi.

== Healthcare ==
To cater the medical needs of patients, especially those with tuberculosis, people go to:

- Govt. Hospital Khunti
- Ramkrishna Sanatorium

== Schools and colleges ==
For making children literate the state government provides:

- Govt. Basic School
- Jaipal Singh High School
- Birsa College, Khunti
- St. Joseph Intermediate College, Torpa

== Place for worship ==
There is a catholic church in the village, where villagers and nearby people come to offer mass.
