= Kitahatu =

- Village
- Location in Jharkhand, India Kitahatu (India)
- Coordinates: 23.0067°N 85.4145°E
- Country: India
- State: Jharkhand

Languages
  - Official: Hindi, Santali
- Time zone: UTC+5:30 (IST)
- Vehicle registration: JH

Kitahatu is a village in Murhu block, Khunti district, in the Indian state of Jharkhand.

== Geography ==
Cities, towns and locations in Khunti district in South Chotanagpur Division
M: municipality, CT: census town, R: rural/ urban centre, T: tourist centre
Owing to space constraints in the small map, the actual locations in a larger map may vary slightly

=== Location ===
Kitahatu is located at 23.0067°N 85.4145°E.

=== Area overview ===
In the adjacent map the area shown is “undulating and covered with hills, hillocks and jungles (jungles/ forests are shown as shaded area in the map). The soil of the area is rocky, sandy and red loam upland. There are paddy fields only in the depressions. It has a gentle slope adjacent to the streams.” A major part of the district is in the altitude range of 500–700 metres (1,600–2,300 ft), with up to ± 200 m for some parts. In 2011, it had a density of population of 210 persons per sq km. Khunti is an overwhelmingly rural district with 91.5% of the population living in rural areas. Famous places in this area are Ulihatu, the birth place of Bhagwan Birsa Munda, and Dombari Buru, the central point of his activity.

Note: The map alongside presents some of the notable locations in the district. All places marked in the map are linked in the larger full screen map.

== Weaving ==
Traditional cotton sarees, now used only in the tribal marriage ceremony, presented to the bride by the groom's family and ronoh (a designed cloth made of two separate pieces of light maroon and off-white hand-woven cotton sewn together and presented as a wedding gift to the groom) are woven in Kitahatu on handmade handlooms. It is a Munda (tribal) community.

The nearest rural marketplace is at about 3 km (1.9 mi) in the direction of Khunti, at Soyko. Soyko's is a bustling market where lac, and other forest produce can be found.

== Demographics ==
According to the 2011 Census of India, Kitahatu had a total population of 926, of which 457 (49%) were males and 469 (51%) were females. Population in the age range 0-6 years was 138. The total number of literate persons in Kitahatu was 575 (72.97% of the population over 6 years).

(*For language details see Murhu block#Language and religion)
