= Arki, Khunti =

Arki
- Village
- Location in Jharkhand, India Arki (India)
- Coordinates: 23.007624°N 85.532256°E
- Country: India
- State: Jharkhand
- District: Khunti

Government
  - Type: Federal democracy

Population (2011)
  - Total: 2,469

Languages *
  - Official: Hindi, Urdu
- Time zone: UTC+5:30 (IST)
- PIN: 835225
- Telephone/ STD code: 06528
- Vehicle registration: JH 23
- Literacy: 75.24%
- Lok Sabha constituency: Khunti
- Vidhan Sabha constituency: Tamar
- Website: khunti.nic.in

Arki is a village in the Arki CD block in the Khunti Sadar subdivision of the Khunti district in the Indian state of Jharkhand.

== Geography ==
Cities, towns and locations in Khunti district in South Chotanagpur Division
M: municipality, CT: census town, R: rural/ urban centre, T: tourist centre
Owing to space constraints in the small map, the actual locations in a larger map may vary slightly

=== Location ===
Arki is located at 23.007624°N 85.532256°E

=== Area overview ===
In the adjacent map the area shown is "undulating and covered with hills, hillocks and jungles (jungles/ forests are shown as shaded area in the map). The soil of the area is rocky, sandy and red loam upland. There are paddy fields only in the depressions. It has a gentle slope adjacent to the streams." A major part of the district is in the altitude range of 500–700 metres (1,600–2,300 ft), with up to ± 200 m for some parts. In 2011, it had a density of population of 210 persons per km^{2}. Khunti is an overwhelmingly rural district with 91.5% of the population living in rural areas. Places in this area include Ulihatu, the birthplace of Bhagwan Birsa Munda, and Dombari Buru, the central point of his activity.

Note: The map alongside presents some of the notable locations in the district. All places marked in the map are linked in the larger full screen map.

== Civic administration ==
=== Police station ===
There is a police station at Arki.

=== CD block HQ ===
The headquarters of Arki CD block are located at Arki village.

== Demographics ==
According to the 2011 Census of India, Arki had a total population of 2,469, of which 1,207 (49%) were males and 1,262 (51%) were females. Population in the age range 0–6 years was 320. The total number of literate persons in Arki was 1,617 (75.24% of the population over 6 years).

(*For language details see Arki block#Language and religion)

== Education ==
Krishna Ballabh High School Murmu is a Hindi-medium coeducational institution established in 1961. It has facilities for teaching from class IX to class XII. The school has a playground and a library with 1,600 books.

Kasturba Gandhi Balika Vidyalaya is a Hindi-medium girls only institution established in 2005. It has facilities for teaching from class VI to class XII. The school has a playground, a library with 1,969 books and has 9 computers for learning and teaching purposes.

Model School Arki is a Hindi-medium coeducational institution established in 2010. It has facilities for teaching from class VI to class X. The school has a playground.

Project Girls High School is a Hindi-medium girls only institution established in 1984. It has facilities for teaching from class VI to class X. The school has a playground and a library with 426 books.

== Healthcare ==
There is a Community Health Centre at Arki and Primary Health Centres in Tubid and Birbanki. There are 22 Health Sub Centres in Arki block.
