= Madhukama, Karra =

Madhukama
- Village
- Interactive map of Madhukama
- Country: India
- State: Jharkhand
- District: Khunti
- Block: Karra

Area
  - Total: 1.68 km^{2} (0.65 sq mi)

Population (2011)
  - Total: 579
  - Density: 345/km^{2} (893/sq mi)
- Vehicle registration: JH 23

Madhukama is a village in the Karra CD block of Khunti district in the Indian state of Jharkhand. It is situated in the undulating plateau region of the Chota Nagpur Plateau, approximately 30 kilometers from the state capital, Ranchi.

== History ==
The village is located within the historic tribal heartland of the Munda people. Historically, the region followed the traditional Khuntkatti land system. In the late 19th century, the surrounding Karra and Khunti areas were central to the Ulgulan (The Great Tumult) movement led by the tribal freedom fighter Birsa Munda. Following the reorganization of districts in Jharkhand, Madhukama became part of the newly created Khunti district on 12 September 2007.

== Demographics ==
According to the 2011 Census of India, Madhukama has a total population of 579, comprising 298 males and 281 females.

- Ethnic Composition: The village is home to a predominantly tribal population, with Scheduled Tribes accounting for 99.48% of the total residents.
- Literacy: The literacy rate stands at 41.09%, with male literacy at 47.62% and female literacy at 34.30%.
- Language: The primary languages spoken in the village are Mundari, Nagpuri, and Hindi.

== Culture and Religion ==
The community maintains a strong connection to traditional tribal customs. Major festivals celebrated include Sarhul (the festival of flowers), Karma, and Sohrai.

A significant religious landmark near the village is Amreshwar Dham (Angrabari), located on the Ranchi-Khunti road. This ancient temple complex, dedicated to Lord Shiva, features a self-manifested (Swayambhu) Shivalinga. Within the village, the local Shivalaya (Shiva Temple) serves as a focal point for daily worship and community gatherings, particularly during the holy month of Shravan.

== Education ==
Educational needs are met by government and private institutions in the vicinity, including:

- Government Middle School, Bamhari
- St. Francis School, Karra
- SS High School, Karra
- Higher education facilities are primarily accessed in Khunti town or Ranchi.

== Transport ==
Madhukama is connected via local roads to the Karra block headquarters. The nearest railway connectivity is provided by the Karra and Lodhma railway stations, while Ranchi Junction railway station serves as the major regional rail hub.
