= Maranghada =

- Village
- Location in Jharkhand, India Maranghada (India)
- Coordinates: 23.082032°N 85.402256°E
- Country: India
- State: Jharkhand
- District: Khunti

Government
  - Type: Federal democracy

Population (2011)
  - Total: 962

Languages *
  - Official: Hindi, Urdu
- Time zone: UTC+5:30 (IST)
- PIN: 835210
- Telephone/ STD code: 06528
- Vehicle registration: JH 23
- Literacy: 59.07%
- Lok Sabha constituency: Khunti
- Vidhan Sabha constituency: Khunti
- Website: khunti.nic.in

Maranghada is a village in the Khunti CD block in the Khunti Sadar subdivision of the Khunti district in the Indian state of Jharkhand.

== Geography ==
Cities, towns and locations in Khunti district in South Chotanagpur Division
M: municipality, CT: census town, R: rural/ urban centre, T: tourist centre
Owing to space constraints in the small map, the actual locations in a larger map may vary slightly

=== Location ===
Maranghada is located at 23.082032°N 85.402256°E

=== Area overview ===
In the adjacent map the area shown is "undulating and covered with hills, hillocks and jungles (jungles/ forests are shown as shaded area in the map). The soil of the area is rocky, sandy and red loam upland. There are paddy fields only in the depressions. It has a gentle slope adjacent to the streams." A major part of the district is in the altitude range of 500–700 metres (1,600–2,300 ft), with up to ± 200 m for some parts. In 2011, it had a density of population of 210 persons per sq km. Khunti is an overwhelmingly rural district with 91.5% of the population living in rural areas. Famous places in this area are Ulihatu, the birth place of Bhagwan Birsa Munda, and Dombari Buru, the central point of his activity.

Note: The map alongside presents some of the notable locations in the district. All places marked in the map are linked in the larger full screen map.

== Civic administration ==
=== Police station ===
There is a police station at Maranghada.

== Demographics ==
According to the 2011 Census of India, Maranghada had a total population of 962, of which 513 (53%) were males and 449 (47%) were females. Population in the age range 0–6 years was 178 The total number of literate persons in Maranghada was 463 (59.07% of the population over 6 years).

(*For language details see Khunti block#Language and religion)

== Education ==
High School Maranghada is a Hindi-medium coeducational institution established in 1968. It has facilities for teaching in classes IX and X. The school has a playground and a library with 435 books.

== Healthcare ==
There is a Primary Health Centre in Maranghada.
