= Dorma, India =

Dorma
- Villages
- Location in Jharkhand, India Dorma (India)
- Coordinates: 23.0062655°N 85.1636748°E
- Country: India
- State: Jharkhand
- District: Khunti
- Elevation: 452 m (1,483 ft)

Population (2001)
  - Total: 16,400

Languages
  - Official: Hindi
- Time zone: UTC+5:30 (IST)
- Postal code: 835227
- Telephone code: 06538
- Vehicle registration: JH
- Sex Ratio: 1004:1000 ♂/♀

Dorma is a small village or hamlet in Torpa Block, Khunti District, Jharkhand, India. It comes under Domra Panchayath. It is 29 km (18 mi) west from the district headquarters and 59 km (37 mi) from the state capital at Ranchi.

== Geography ==
Dorma is surrounded by Rania Block to the south, Kamdara Block to the west, Murhu Block to the east, and Karra Block to the north. Khunti, Ranchi, Gumla, and Chakradharpur are nearby cities. It is in the border of the Khunti District and Gumla District. Gumla District Kamdara is west from Dorma.

== Physiography ==
Uneven plains and some rocky mountains lie as this region comes under plateau region of Chotta Nagpur.

== Demographics ==
Hindi is the local language. Most of the population are Munda people, speaking Mundari language.

== Transport ==
=== Railway ===
There is no railway station near Dorma in less than 10 km. However, Hatia Rail Way Station is major railway station 52 km near Dorma.

=== Roadway ===
Roads connecting major cities are providing movement for passenger and freight traffic. There is a district road connecting Torpa, Murhu, Govindpur and Ranchi.

== Schools and colleges ==
Colleges near Dorma is St Joseph Intermediate College, Torpa. Nirmala High School Dorma.
