= Sodag =

- Village
- Location in Jharkhand, India Sodag (India)
- Coordinates: 23.1436147°N 85.3873703°E
- Country: India
- State: Jharkhand
- District: Khunti
- Elevation: 675 m (2,215 ft)

Population (2001)
  - Total: 15,400

Languages
  - Official: Hindi
- Time zone: UTC+5:30 (IST)
- Postal code: 835227
- Telephone code: 06528
- Vehicle registration: JH
- Sex Ratio: 1094:1000 ♂/♀

Sodag is a small Village/hamlet in Khunti Block in Khunti District of Jharkhand State, India. It comes under Ganeor Panchayath. It is located south of District headquarters Khunti and 32 km from State capital Ranchi.
