= Torpa =

Torpa may refer to:

== Places ==
=== Norway ===
- Torpa Municipality, a former municipality in the old Oppland county

=== Sweden ===
- Torpa (district), a district in Gothenburg
- Torpa, Vänersborg, a district of Vänersborg
- Torpa, Ydre, a village in Ydre Municipality

=== India ===
- Torpa block, a community development block in Khunti district of Jharkhand
  - Torpa (Vidhan Sabha constituency)
  - Torpa, India, a census town in Jharkhand

=== In fiction ===
- Torpa, a fictional town in Russia in the 2007 novel Vita Nostra by Marina and Sergey Dyachenko
