= Karra, Khunti =

Karra
- Village
- Location in Jharkhand, India Karra (India)
- Coordinates: 23.130402°N 85.129446°E
- Country: India
- State: Jharkhand
- District: Khunti

Government
  - Type: Federal democracy

Population (2011)
  - Total: 2,212

Languages *
  - Official: Hindi, Urdu
- Time zone: UTC+5:30 (IST)
- PIN: 835210
- Telephone/ STD code: 06528
- Vehicle registration: JH 23
- Literacy: 82.74%
- Lok Sabha constituency: Khunti
- Vidhan Sabha constituency: Khunti
- Website: khunti.nic.in

Karra is a village in the Karra CD block in the Khunti Sadar subdivision of the Khunti district in the Indian state of Jharkhand.

== Geography ==
Cities, towns and locations in Khunti district in South Chotanagpur Division
M: municipality, CT: census town, R: rural/ urban centre, T: tourist centre
Owing to space constraints in the small map, the actual locations in a larger map may vary slightly

=== Location ===
Karra is located at 23.130402°N 85.129446°E

=== Area overview ===
In the adjacent map the area shown is "undulating and covered with hills, hillocks and jungles (jungles/ forests are shown as shaded area in the map). The soil of the area is rocky, sandy and red loam upland. There are paddy fields only in the depressions. It has a gentle slope adjacent to the streams." A major part of the district is in the altitude range of 500–700 metres (1,600–2,300 ft), with up to ± 200 m for some parts. In 2011, it had a density of population of 210 persons per sq km. Khunti is an overwhelmingly rural district with 91.5% of the population living in rural areas. Famous places in this area are Ulihatu, the birth place of Bhagwan Birsa Munda, and Dombari Buru, the central point of his activity.

Note: The map alongside presents some of the notable locations in the district. All places marked in the map are linked in the larger full screen map.

== Civic administration ==
=== Police station ===
There is a police station at Karra.

=== CD block HQ ===
The headquarters of Karra CD block are located at Karra village.

== Demographics ==
According to the 2011 Census of India, Karra had a total population of 2,212, of which 1,092 (49%) were males and 1,120 (51%) were females. Population in the age range 0–6 years was 288. The total number of literate persons in Karra was 1,592 (82.74% of the population over 6 years).

(*For language details see Karra block#Language and religion)

== Transport ==
There is a station at Karra on the Hatia–Rourkela line.

== Education ==
Government High School Karra is a Hindi-medium coeducational institution established in 1961. It has facilities for teaching from class IX to class XII. The school has a playground and a library with 534 books.

Kasturba Gandhi Balika Vidyalaya is a Hindi-medium girls only institution established in 2006. It has facilities for teaching from class VI to class XII. The school has a library with 312 books and has 5 computers for learning and teaching purposes.

Jyoti Kanya High School Karra is a Hindi-medium girls only institution established in 1971. It has facilities for teaching from class VII to class X. It has a playground, a library with 1,353 books, and has 5 computers for teaching and learning purposes.

Model School Karra is an English-medium coeducational institution established in 2011. It has facilities for teaching from class VI to class X. The school has a playground.

== Healthcare ==
There is a Community Health Centre at Karra and a Primary Health Centre in Govindpur. There are 22 Health Sub Centres in Karra block.
