= Birbanki =

- Village
- Location in Jharkhand, India Birbanki (India)
- Coordinates: 22.891032°N 85.516256°E
- Country: India
- State: Jharkhand
- District: Khunti

Government
  - Type: Federal democracy

Population (2011)
  - Total: 2,681

Languages *
  - Official: Hindi, Urdu
- Time zone: UTC+5:30 (IST)
- PIN: 835216
- Telephone/ STD code: 06528
- Vehicle registration: JH 23
- Literacy: 37.91%
- Lok Sabha constituency: Khunti
- Vidhan Sabha constituency: Tamar
- Website: khunti.nic.in

Birbanki is a village in the Arki CD block in the Khunti Sadar subdivision of the Khunti district in the Indian state of Jharkhand.

== Geography ==
Cities, towns and locations in Khunti district in South Chotanagpur Division
M: municipality, CT: census town, R: rural/ urban centre, T: tourist centre
Owing to space constraints in the small map, the actual locations in a larger map may vary slightly

=== Location ===
Birbanki is located at 22.891032°N 85.515256°E

=== Area overview ===
In the adjacent map the area shown is "undulating and covered with hills, hillocks and jungles (jungles/ forests are shown as shaded area in the map). The soil of the area is rocky, sandy and red loam upland. There are paddy fields only in the depressions. It has a gentle slope adjacent to the streams." A major part of the district is in the altitude range of 500–700 metres (1,600–2,300 ft), with up to ± 200 m for some parts. In 2011, it had a density of population of 210 persons per km^{2}. Khunti is an overwhelmingly rural district with 91.5% of the population living in rural areas. Famous places in this area are Ulihatu, the birthplace of Bhagwan Birsa Munda, and Dombari Buru, the central point of his activity.

Note: The map alongside presents some of the notable locations in the district. All places marked in the map are linked in the larger full screen map.

== Demographics ==
According to the 2011 Census of India, Birbanki had a total population of 2,681, of which 1,346 (50%) were males and 1,335 (50%) were females. Population in the age range 0–6 years was 497 The total number of literate persons in Birbanki was 828 (37.91% of the population over 6 years).

== Education ==
Project High School Birbanki is a Hindi-medium coeducational institution established in 1981. It has facilities for teaching in classes IX and X. The school has a playground and a library with 226 books.

== Healthcare ==
There is a Primary Health Centre in Birbanki.
