= Siladon =

- Village
- Location in Jharkhand, India Siladon (India)
- Coordinates: 23.1526748°N 85.3657077°E
- Country: India
- State: Jharkhand
- District: Khunti
- Elevation: 675 m (2,215 ft)

Population (2011)
  - Total: 975

Languages
  - Official: Hindi
- Time zone: UTC+5:30 (IST)
- Postal code: 835227
- Telephone code: 06528
- Vehicle registration: JH
- Sex Ratio: 1094:1000 ♂/♀

Siladon is a small Village/hamlet in Khunti Block in Khunti District of Jharkhand State, India. It comes under Ganeor Panchayath. It is located south of District headquarters Khunti and 30 km from State capital Ranchi.

== History ==
Siladon is the pont of strategic importance as it serves the purpose of meeting point for many nearby places.

== Transport ==
=== Road ===
Siladon is well connected to the State capital Ranchi through village road.

=== Railways ===
There is no railway station near to Ganeor in less than 10 km. However Hatia railway station is major railway station 29 km near to Siladon .

== Siladon Market ==
- Siladon bazar is the main market for nearby people from village for the purpose of lively hood and earning.
- Hastshilpa Swabalambi Sahakari Samiti, Siladon is one of the important place for Lac goods manufacturing
