= Rania =

Rania may refer to:

== Places ==
- Rania, Haryana, a City in Sirsa District, Haryana state of India.
- Ranya, a district in Sulaymaniyah Governorate, Iraqi Kurdistan
- Rania block, a community development block, in Jharkhand, India
  - Rania, Khunti, a village in Jharkhand, India

== People ==
Rania or Raniah (Arabic: رَانِيَة rāniyah), also spelt Raniya, Raniyah, is an Arabic female given name from the root rana to side-look meaning side gazer.

- Rania Al Abdullah (born 1970), Queen consort of Jordan
- Rania Elwani (born 1977), Egyptian swimmer
- Rania Gabsi (born 1988), Tunisian actress
- Rania Mamoun (born 1979), Sudanese journalist and novelist
- Rania Nashar, Saudi businesswoman
- Rania Hussein Muhammad Tawfiq, known as Ruby (born 1981), Egyptian singer
- Rania Youssef (born 1973), Egyptian actress
- Rania Zeriri (born 1986), Dutch singer
- Anika Rania Siddiqui (born 2005), Bangladeshi footballer

== Entertainment ==
- Rania, a former name of the South Korean girl group Blackswan
- Rânia, a 2012 Brazilian drama film
