= Rania, Khunti =

Rania
- Village
- Location in Jharkhand, India Rania (India)
- Coordinates: 22.779302°N 85.104546°E
- Country: India
- State: Jharkhand
- District: Khunti

Government
  - Type: Federal democracy

Population (2011)
  - Total: 862

Languages *
  - Official: Hindi, Urdu
- Time zone: UTC+5:30 (IST)
- PIN: 835216
- Telephone/ STD code: 06528
- Vehicle registration: JH 23
- Literacy: 85.79%
- Lok Sabha constituency: Khunti
- Vidhan Sabha constituency: Torpa
- Website: khunti.nic.in

Rania (spelled Raniiyan in census records) is a village in the Rania CD block in the Khunti Sadar subdivision of the Khunti district in the Indian state of Jharkhand.

== Geography ==
Cities, towns and locations in Khunti district in South Chotanagpur Division
M: municipality, CT: census town, R: rural/ urban centre, T: tourist centre
Owing to space constraints in the small map, the actual locations in a larger map may vary slightly

=== Location ===
Rania is located at 22.779302°N 85.104546°E

=== Area overview ===
In the adjacent map the area shown is "undulating and covered with hills, hillocks and jungles (jungles/ forests are shown as shaded area in the map). The soil of the area is rocky, sandy and red loam upland. There are paddy fields only in the depressions. It has a gentle slope adjacent to the streams." A major part of the district is in the altitude range of 500–700 metres (1,600–2,300 ft), with up to ± 200 m for some parts. In 2011, it had a density of population of 210 persons per sq km. Khunti is an overwhelmingly rural district with 91.5% of the population living in rural areas. Famous places in this area are Ulihatu, the birth place of Bhagwan Birsa Munda, and Dombari Buru, the central point of his activity.

Note: The map alongside presents some of the notable locations in the district. All places marked in the map are linked in the larger full screen map.

== Civic administration ==
=== Police station ===
There is a police station at Rania.

=== CD block HQ ===
The headquarters of Rania CD block are located at Rania village.

== Demographics ==
According to the 2011 Census of India, Raniyan had a total population of 862, of which 408 (47%) were males and 454 (53%) were females. Population in the age range 0–6 years was 109. The total number of literate persons in Raniyan was 646 (85.79% of the population over 6 years).

(*For language details see Rania block#Language and religion)

== Education ==
S.S. High School Rania is a Hindi-medium coeducational institution established in 1974. It has facilities for teaching from IX to class XII. The school has a playground and library with 410 books.

Kasturba Gandhi Balika Vidyalaya is a Hindi-medium girls only institution established in 2006. It has facilities for teaching from class VI to class XII. The school has a playground, a library with 348 books and has 10 computers for learning and teaching purposes.

== Healthcare ==
There is a Community Health Centre at Rania. There are 10 Health Sub Centres in Rania block.
