= Arki =

Arki may refer to:

- Arki, India, a town in Himachal Pradesh, India
  - Arki Fort
  - Arki (Vidhan Sabha constituency)
- Arki block, a community development block in Jharkhand, India
  - Arki, Khunti, a village in Jharkhand, India
- Arki, Iran, a village in Razavi Khorasan Province, Iran
- Nichijou, a manga and anime series (manga was released in Finland as Arki)

== See also ==
- Arkie
- Arkies
- Arkley
- Arkoi
