= Hirni Falls =

Waterfall in India

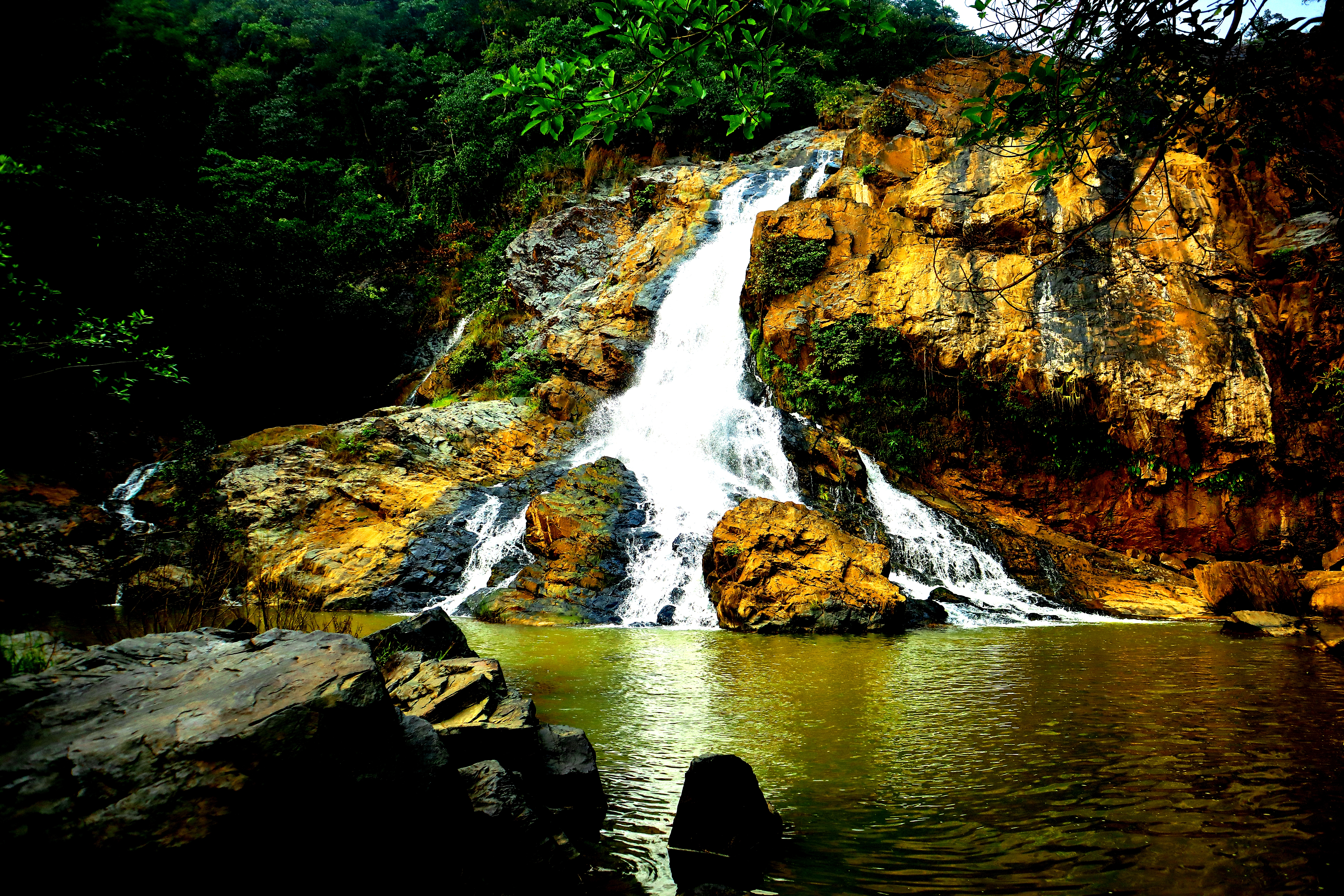
- Interactive map of Hirni Falls
- Location: West Singhbhum, Jharkhand, India
- Coordinates: 22°52′00″N 85°20′00″E
- Elevation: 608 metres (1,995 ft)
- Total height: 37 metres (121 ft)
- Watercourse: Ramgarha River

Hirni Falls is a waterfall located in West Singhbhum in the Indian state of Jharkhand.

== Falls ==
At an edge of the Ranchi plateau, around Bandgaon, the Ramgarha River plunges down 37 metres (121 ft) in a broad torrent as the Hirni Falls. Situated in a dense forest area, Hirni has been favoured by nature for scenic beauties.

== Transport ==
Hirni Falls is 20 kilometres (12 mi) from Khunti, 62 kilometres (39 mi) from Ranchi and 68 kilometres (42 mi) from Chaibasa, off Ranchi-Chaibasa Road.

== See also ==
- List of waterfalls
- List of waterfalls in India
- List of waterfalls in India by height
- Ranchi travel guide from Wikivoyage
