= Arky =

Arky may refer to:

- Arky Michael, an Australian actor
- Arky Vaughan, member of the Baseball Hall of Fame
- Arky, a robot in the Manhunter comic book series
- A nickname for a person named Archibald
- A nickname for a person from the US state of Arkansas

== See also ==
- Arki (disambiguation)
- Arkie
- Arkies
- Arkley
