= Murhu =

- Village
- Location in Jharkhand, India Murhu (India)
- Coordinates: 22.963302°N 85.277546°E
- Country: India
- State: Jharkhand
- District: Khunti

Government
  - Type: Federal democracy

Population (2011)
  - Total: 3,887

Languages *
  - Official: Hindi, Urdu , Mundari
- Time zone: UTC+5:30 (IST)
- PIN: 835216
- Telephone/ STD code: 06528
- Vehicle registration: JH 23
- Literacy: 86.02%
- Lok Sabha constituency: Khunti
- Vidhan Sabha constituency: Khunti
- Website: khunti.nic.in

Murhu is a village in the Murhu CD block in the Khunti Sadar subdivision of the Khunti district in the Indian state of Jharkhand.

== Geography ==
Cities, towns and locations in Khunti district in South Chotanagpur Division
M: municipality, CT: census town, R: rural/ urban centre, T: tourist centre
Owing to space constraints in the small map, the actual locations in a larger map may vary slightly

=== Location ===
Murhu is located at 22.963302°N 85.277546°E

=== Area overview ===
In the adjacent map the area shown is "undulating and covered with hills, hillocks and jungles (jungles/ forests are shown as shaded area in the map). The soil of the area is rocky, sandy and red loam upland. There are paddy fields only in the depressions. It has a gentle slope adjacent to the streams." A major part of the district is in the altitude range of 500–700 metres (1,600–2,300 ft), with up to ± 200 m for some parts. In 2011, it had a density of population of 210 persons per sq km. Khunti is an overwhelmingly rural district with 91.5% of the population living in rural areas. Famous places in this area are Ulihatu, the birth place of Bhagwan Birsa Munda, and Dombari Buru, the central point of his activity.

Note: The map alongside presents some of the notable locations in the district. All places marked in the map are linked in the larger full screen map.

== Civic administration ==
=== Police station ===
There is a police station at Murhu.

=== CD block HQ ===
The headquarters of Murhu CD block are located at Murhu village.

== Demographics ==
According to the 2011 Census of India, Murhu had a total population of 3,887, of which 1,961 (50%) were males and 1,926 (50%) were females. Population in the age range 0–6 years was 510. The total number of literate persons in Murhu was 2,905 (86.02% of the population over 6 years).

(*For language details see Murhu block#Language and religion)

== Education ==
Lakshmi Narayan High School Murmu is a Hindi-medium coeducational institution established in 1956. It has facilities for teaching from class VII to class XII. The school has a playground and a library with 2,272 books.

St. Mary Balika High School Murhu is a Hindi-medium girls only institution established in 1962. It has facilities for teaching from class VII to class X. The school has a playground, a library with 2,030 books and has 5 computers for learning and teaching purposes.

St. John’s High School Murhu is a Hindi-medium coeducational institution established in 1978. It has facilities for teaching from class VII to class X. The school has a playground, a library with 2,208 books and has 2 computers for teaching and learning purposes.

== Healthcare ==
There is a Community Health Centre at Murhu. There are 18 Health Sub Centres in Murhu block.
