= Torpa, India =

Torpa
- Census Town
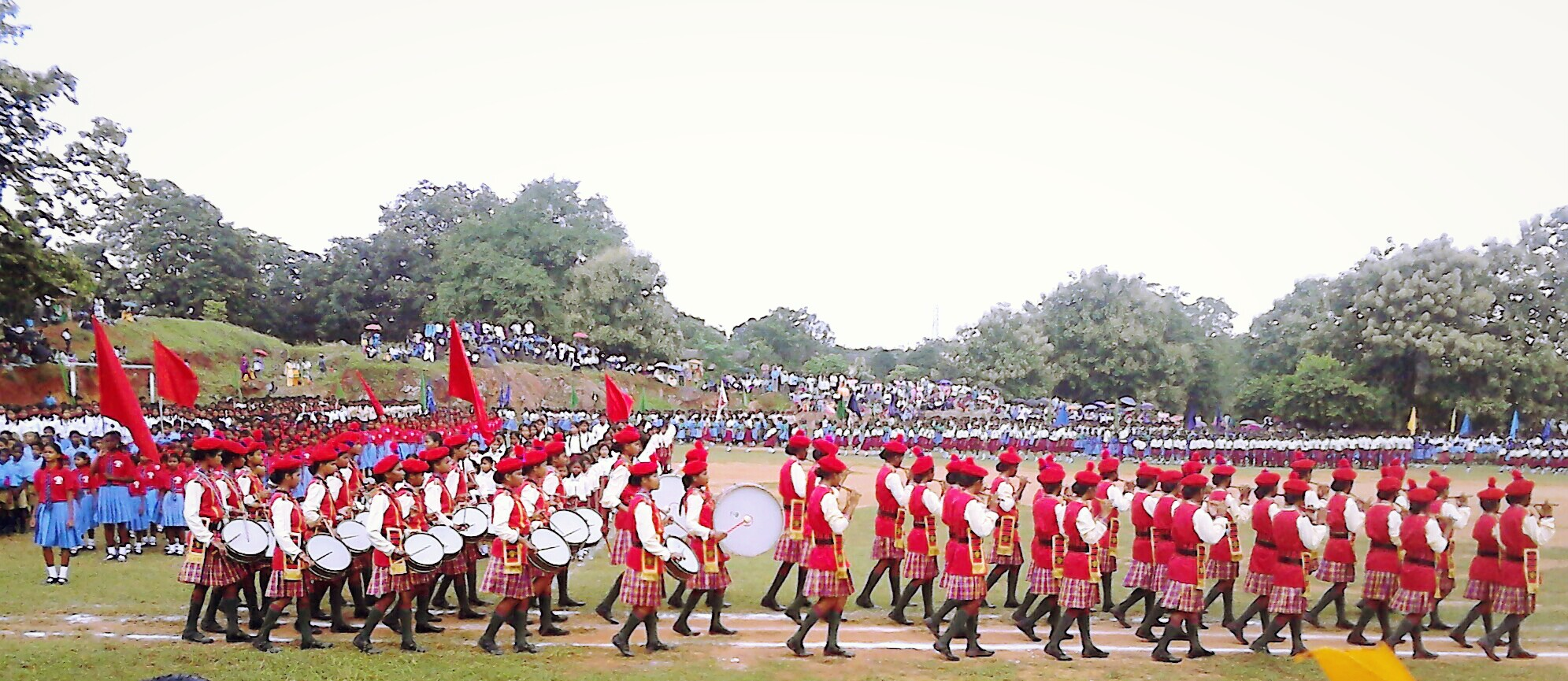
- Independence day celebrations at St. Joseph’s ground

- Location in Jharkhand, India Torpa (India)
- Coordinates: 22.932302°N 85.093446°E
- Country: India
- State: Jharkhand
- District: Khunti

Government
  - Type: Federal democracy

Population (2011)
  - Total: 8,592

Languages *
  - Official: Hindi, Urdu
- Time zone: UTC+5:30 (IST)
- PIN: 835227
- Telephone/ STD code: 06538
- Vehicle registration: JH 23
- Literacy: 86.30%
- Lok Sabha constituency: Khunti
- Vidhan Sabha constituency: Torpa
- Website: khunti.nic.in

Torpa is a census town in the Torpa CD block in the Khunti Sadar subdivision of the Khunti district in the Indian state of Jharkhand.

== Geography ==
Cities, towns and locations in Khunti district in South Chotanagpur Division
M: municipality, CT: census town, R: rural/ urban centre, T: tourist centre
Owing to space constraints in the small map, the actual locations in a larger map may vary slightly

=== Location ===
Torpa is located at 22.932302°N 85.093446°E

=== Area overview ===
In the adjacent map the area shown is “undulating and covered with hills, hillocks and jungles (jungles/ forests are shown as shaded area in the map). The soil of the area is rocky, sandy and red loam upland. There are paddy fields only in the depressions. It has a gentle slope adjacent to the streams.” A major part of the district is in the altitude range of 500–700 metres (1,600–2,300 ft), with up to ± 200 m for some parts. In 2011, it had a density of population of 210 persons per sq km. Khunti is an overwhelmingly rural district with 91.5% of the population living in rural areas. Famous places in this area are Ulihatu, the birth place of Bhagwan Birsa Munda, and Dombari Buru, the central point of his activity.

Note: The map alongside presents some of the notable locations in the district. All places marked in the map are linked in the larger full screen map.

== Civic administration ==
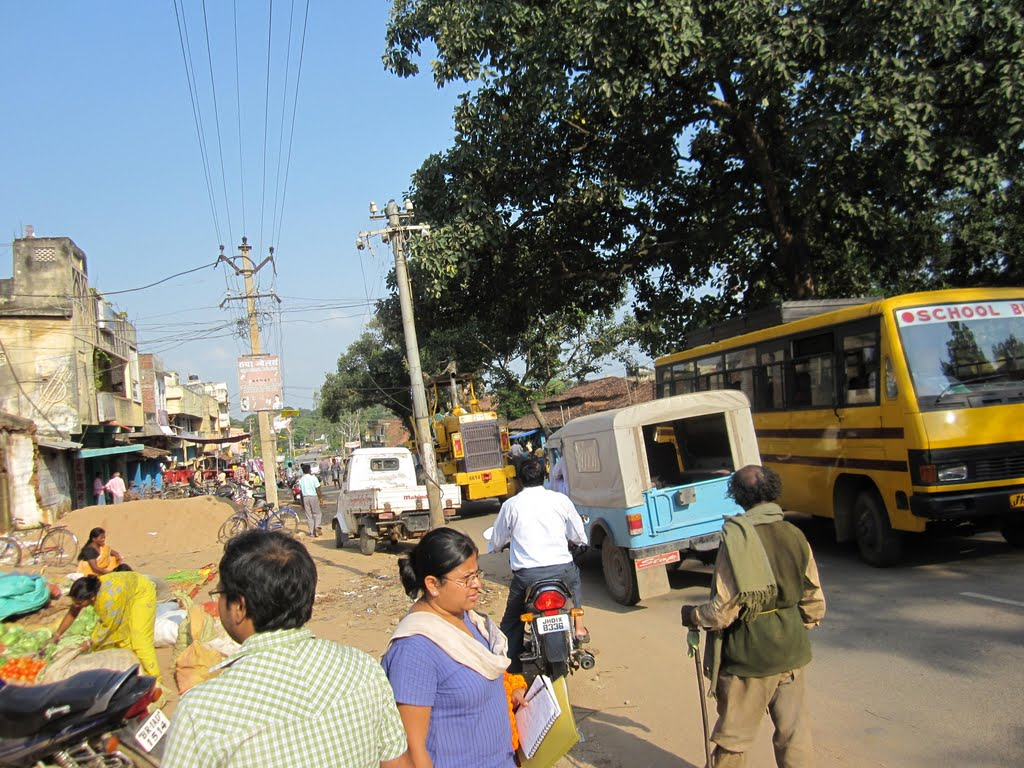
Torpa town

=== Police station ===
There is a police station at Torpa.

=== CD block HQ ===
The headquarters of Torpa CD block are located at Torpa town.

== Demographics ==
According to the 2011 Census of India, Torpa had a total population of 8,592, of which 4,275 (50%) were males and 4,317 (50%) were females. Population in the age range 0–6 years was 985. The total number of literate persons in Torpa was 6,565 (86.30% of the population over 6 years).

(*For language details see Torpa block#Language and religion)

== Education ==
St. Joseph’s Inter College is a Hindi-medium coeducational institution established in 1978. It has facilities for teaching in classes XI and XII. It has a playground and has 5 computers for teaching and learning purposes.

St. Joseph’s High School Torpa is a Hindi-medium boys only institution established at Digri in 1924. It has facilities for teaching from class VI to class X. The school has a playground.

St. Anna Girls High School Topra is a Hindi-medium girls only school established in 1963. It has facilities for teaching from class VII to class X. The school has a playground, a library with 1,000 books and has 10 computers for teaching and learning purposes.

Shree Hari High School Torpa is a Hindi-medium coeducational institution established in 1965. It has facilities for teaching from class IX to class XII. The school has a library with 505 books.

== Healthcare ==
There is a Government Referral Hospital at Torpa. There are 18 Health Sub Centres in Torpa block.
