= Arki block =

Arki
- Community development block
- Coordinates: 23.007624°N 85.532256°E
- Country: India
- State: Jharkhand
- District: Khunti

Government
  - Type: Federal democracy

Area
  - Total: 514.94 km^{2} (198.82 sq mi)

Population (2011)
  - Total: 80,589
  - Density: 156.50/km^{2} (405.34/sq mi)

Languages
  - Official: Hindi, Urdu
- Time zone: UTC+5:30 (IST)
- PIN: 835225
- Telephone/STD code: 06528
- Vehicle registration: JH 23
- Literacy: 54.21%
- Lok Sabha constituency: Khunti
- Vidhan Sabha constituency: Tamar
- Website: khunti.nic.in

Arki block is a CD block that forms an administrative division in the Khunti Sadar subdivision of Khunti district, in the Indian state of Jharkhand.

== History ==
Khunti subdivision was formed in Ranchi district in 1905 and Khunti district was created on 12 September 2007.

== Maoist activities ==
Hemant Soren, Chief Minister of Jharkhand, has claimed, in September 2021, that effective action against left wing extremism has reduced the active involvement of such groups to only a few areas that includes the tri-junction of Khunti, Seraikela Kharsawan and West Singhbhum districts. Khunti has been a Maoist-hit district. Well co-ordinated efforts by Jharkhand police, including community policing programmes in remote areas, have shown positive results.

== Geography ==
Khunti district occupies a part of the Ranchi Plateau with hills and undulating terrain. A major part of the district is in the altitude range of 500–700 metres (1,600–2,300 ft), with up to ± 200 m for some parts.

Arki CD block is bounded by Bundu and Tamar CD blocks in Ranchi district on the north, Kuchai CD block in Seraikela Kharsawan district on the east, Bandgaon CD block in West Singhbhum district on south, and Murhu and Khunti CD blocks on the west.

Arki CD block has an area of 514.94 km^{2}.Arki police station serves Arki CD block. The headquarters of Arki CD block is located at Arki village.

== Demographics ==
=== Population ===
According to the 2011 Census of India, Arki CD block had a total population of 80,589, all of which were rural. There were 40,473 (50%) males and 40,116 (50%) females. Population in the age range 0–6 years was 13,379. Scheduled Castes numbered 4,708 (5.84%) and Scheduled Tribes numbered 63,804 (79.17%).

=== Literacy ===
According to the 2011 census, the total number of literate persons in Arki CD block was 36,433 (54.21% of the population over 6 years) out of which males numbered 22,640 (67.41% of the male population over 6 years) and females numbered 13,793 (41.02% of the female population over 6 years). The gender disparity (the difference between female and male literacy rates) was 26,39%.

As of 2011 census, literacy in Khunti district was 64.51%. Literacy in Jharkhand was 67.63% in 2011. Literacy in India in 2011 was 74.04%.

See also – List of Jharkhand districts ranked by literacy rate

Literacy in CD Blocks of
Khunti district
Khunti Sadar subdivision
Karra – 62.04%
Torpa – 71.18%
Rania – 65.77%
Murhu – 63.42%
Khunti – 58.40%
Arki – 54.21%
Source: 2011 Census: CD block Wise
Primary Census Abstract Data

=== Language and religion ===
Religion in Arki CD block (2011)
Sarna	55.89%
Hinduism	31.37%
Christianity	11.46%
Islam	0.48%
Other or not stated	0.81%

Hindi is the official language in Jharkhand and Urdu has been declared as an additional official language.

Languages in Arki CD block (2011)
1. Mundari (74.6%)
2. Kurmali (18.0%)
3. Hindi (2.51%)
4. Sadri (1.60%)
5. Puran Bhasha (1.48%)
6. Other (1.82%)

Scheduled Tribes numbered 389,626 and formed 73.25% of the total population of Khunti district in 2011. Within the scheduled tribes the more populous tribes were (percentage of ST population in 2011 in brackets): Munda, Patars (83.66%), Oraon, Dhangars (8.52%), Lohras (3.85%), Chik Baraik (0.65%) and Mahli (0.46). Other smaller tribal groups were Bhumij, Banjara, Chero, Khond and Kol. “The place has been in recorded annals of history for its long drawn struggle against the British under the aegis of Birsa Munda, the revolutionary hero of Jharkhand.”

== Rural poverty ==
60-70% of the population of Ranchi district, of which the present Khunti district was then a part, were in the BPL category in 2004–2005. In 2011-12, the proportion of BPL population in Khunti district came down to 35.45%. According to a study in 2013 (modified in 2019), "the incidence of poverty in Jharkhand is estimated at 46%, but 60% of the scheduled castes and scheduled tribes are still below poverty line."

== Economy ==
=== Livelihood ===
Livelihood
in Arki CD block
1. Cultivators (58.8%)
2. Agricultural labourers (30.6%)
3. Household industries (4.39%)
4. Other Workers (6.19%)

In Arki CD block in 2011, amongst the class of total workers, cultivators numbered 26,459 and formed 58.81%, agricultural labourers numbered 13,767 and formed 30.60%, household industry workers numbered 1,975 and formed 4.39% and other workers numbered 2,786 and formed 6.19%. Total workers numbered 44,987 and formed 55.82% of the total population, and non-workers numbered 35,602 and formed 44.19% of the population.

=== Infrastructure ===
There are 128 inhabited villages in Arki CD block. In 2011, 17 villages had power supply. 6 villages had tap water (treated/ untreated), 124 villages had well water (covered/ uncovered), 120 villages had hand pumps, and 1 village did not have drinking water facility. 3 villages had post offices, 8 villages had sub post offices, 29 villages had mobile phone coverage. 127 villages had pucca (paved) village roads, 19 villages had bus service (public/ private), 3 villages had taxi/ vans, 27 villages had tractors. 2 villages had bank branches, 1 village had agricultural credit society, 2 villages had public library and reading rooms, 49 villages had public distribution system, 47 villages had assembly polling stations.

== Education ==
Arki CD block had 16 villages with pre-primary schools, 92 villages with primary schools, 42 villages with middle schools, 3 villages with secondary schools, 35 villages had no educational facility.
.*Senior secondary schools are also known as Inter colleges in Jharkhand

== Healthcare ==
Arki CD block had 4 villages with primary health centres, 14 villages with primary health subcentres, 1 village with maternity and child welfare centre, 7 villages with allopathic hospitals, 4 villages with medicine shops.
.*Private medical practitioners, alternative medicine etc. not included

There is a Community Health Centre at Arki and Primary Health Centres in Tubid and Birbanki. There are 22 Health Sub Centres in Arki block.
