= Karra block =

Karra
- Community development block
- Coordinates: 23.130402°N 85.126446°E
- Country: India
- State: Jharkhand
- District: Khunti

Government
  - Type: Federal democracy

Area
  - Total: 507.10 km^{2} (195.79 sq mi)

Population (2011)
  - Total: 109,082
  - Density: 215.11/km^{2} (557.13/sq mi)

Languages
  - Official: Hindi, Urdu
- Time zone: UTC+5:30 (IST)
- PIN: 835210
- Telephone/STD code: 06528
- Vehicle registration: JH 23
- Literacy: 62.04%
- Lok Sabha constituency: Khunti
- Vidhan Sabha constituency: Khunti
- Website: khunti.nic.in

Karra block is a CD block that forms an administrative division in the Khunti Sadar subdivision of Khunti district, in the Indian state of Jharkhand.

== History ==
Khunti subdivision was formed in Ranchi district in 1905 and Khunti district was created on 12 September 2007.

== Maoist activities ==
Hemant Soren, Chief Minister of Jharkhand, has claimed, in September 2021, that effective action against left wing extremism has reduced the active involvement of such groups to only a few areas that includes the tri-junction of Khunti, Seraikela Kharsawan and West Singhbhum districts. Khunti has been a Maoist-hit district. Well co-ordinated efforts by Jharkhand police, including community policing programmes in remote areas, have shown positive results.

== Geography ==
Khunti district occupies a part of the Ranchi Plateau with hills and undulating terrain. A major part of the district is in the altitude range of 500–700 metres (1,600–2,300 ft), with up to ± 200 m for some parts.

Karra CD block is bounded by Itki, Nagri and Namkum CD blocks in Ranchi district on the north, Khunti and Murhu CD blocks on the east, Torpa CD block and Kamdara CD block in Gumla district on the south, and Lapung CD block in Ranchi district on the west.

Karra CD block has an area of 507.10 km^{2}.Karra police station serves Karra CD block. The headquarters of Karra CD block is located at Karra village.

== Demographics ==
=== Population ===
According to the 2011 Census of India, Karra CD block had a total population of 109,082, all of which were rural. There were 54,615 (50%) males and 54,467 (50%) females. Population in the age range 0–6 years was 18,141. Scheduled Castes numbered 4,325 (3.96%) and Scheduled Tribes numbered 80,930 (74.19%).

=== Literacy ===
According to the 2011 census, the total number of literate persons in Karra CD block was 56,423 (62.04% of the population over 6 years) out of which males numbered 32,665 (72.08% of the male population over 6 years) and females numbered 23,758 (52.08% of the female population over 6 years). The gender disparity (the difference between female and male literacy rates) was 20.00%. As of 2011 census, literacy in Khunti district was 64.51%. Literacy in Jharkhand was 67.63% in 2011. Literacy in India in 2011 was 74.04%.

See also – List of Jharkhand districts ranked by literacy rate

Literacy in CD Blocks of
Khunti district
Khunti Sadar subdivision
Karra – 62.04%
Torpa – 71.18%
Rania – 65.77%
Murhu – 63.42%
Khunti – 58.40%
Arki – 54.21%
Source: 2011 Census: CD block Wise
Primary Census Abstract Data

=== Language and religion ===
Religion in Karra CD block (2011)
Sarna	49.15%
Hinduism	25.12%
Christianity	22.58%
Islam	2.75%
Other or not stated	0.39%

Hindi is the official language in Jharkhand and Urdu has been declared as an additional official language.

Languages in Karra CD block (2011)
1. Sadri (54.4%)
2. Mundari (37.9%)
3. Hindi (4.57%)
4. Kurukh (1.31%)
5. Odia (0.97%)
6. Other (0.81%)

Scheduled Tribes numbered 389,626 and formed 73.25% of the total population of Khunti district in 2011. Within the scheduled tribes the more populous tribes were (percentage of ST population in 2011 in brackets): Munda, Patars (83.66%), Oraon, Dhangars (8.52%), Lohras (3.85%), Chik Baraik (0.65%) and Mahli (0.46). Other smaller tribal groups were Bhumij, Banjara, Chero, Khond and Kol. "The place has been in recorded annals of history for its long drawn struggle against the British under the aegis of Birsa Munda, the revolutionary hero of Jharkhand."

== Rural poverty ==
60-70% of the population of Ranchi district, of which the present Khunti district was then a part, were in the BPL category in 2004–2005. In 2011-12, the proportion of BPL population in Khunti district came down to 35.45%. According to a study in 2013 (modified in 2019), "the incidence of poverty in Jharkhand is estimated at 46%, but 60% of the scheduled castes and scheduled tribes are still below poverty line."

== Economy ==
=== Livelihood ===
Livelihood
in Karra CD block
1. Cultivators (70.5%)
2. Agricultural labourers (19.0%)
3. Household industries (2.36%)
4. Other Workers (8.12%)

In Karra CD block in 2011, amongst the class of total workers, cultivators numbered 37,071 and formed 70.55%, agricultural labourers numbered 9,968 and formed 18.97%, household industry workers numbered 1,239 and formed 2.36% and other workers numbered 4,267 and formed 8.12%. Total workers numbered 56,545 and formed 48.17% of the total population, and non-workers numbered 56,537 and formed 51.83% of the population.

=== Infrastructure ===
There are 178 inhabited villages in Karra CD block. In 2011, 68 villages had power supply. 11 villages had tap water (treated/ untreated), 173 villages had well water (covered/ uncovered), 172 villages had hand pumps, and all villages have drinking water facility. 25 villages had post offices, 11 villages had sub post offices, 7 villages had telephones (land lines), 88 villages had mobile phone coverage. 178 villages had pucca (paved) village roads, 32 villages had bus service (public/ private), 29 villages had autos/ modified autos, 13 villages had taxi/vans, 35 villages had tractors. 14 villages had bank branches, 10 villages had agricultural credit societies, 3 villages had public library and reading rooms, 104 villages had public distribution system, 90 villages had assembly polling stations.

== Education ==
Karra CD block had 42 villages with pre-primary schools, 129 villages with primary schools, 37 villages with middle schools, 7 villages with secondary schools, 2 villages with senior secondary schools, 36 villages had no educational facility.
.*Senior secondary schools are lso known as Inter colleges in Jharkhand

== Healthcare ==
Karra CD block had 3 villages with primary health centres, 28 villages with primary health subcentres, 6 villages with maternity and child welfare centres, 8 villages with allopathic hospitals, 3 villages with dispensaries, 3 villages with veterinary hospitals, 4 villages with family welfare centres, 24 villages with medicine shops.
.*Private medical practitioners, alternative medicine etc. not included
