= Saridkel =

- Saridkhel, Saradkel
- Location within Jharkhand Location within India
- 23.059693°N 85.335188°E
- Type: Settlement
- Periods: Middle kingdoms of India
- Location: Jharkhand, India
- Region: Khunti district

History
- Built: c.20 BCE - c.100 CE

Site notes
- Material: burnt bricks
- Excavation dates: 2004

Saridkel is an ancient site located in the Khunti district of the Indian state of Jharkhand. Ruins of burnt brick houses are found on the site, along with redware pottery, copper tools, coins, gold earrings and iron tools. Well-fortified buildings suggest that it was probably a royal house or monastery of the 1st or 2nd century CE.

== History ==
The British discovered Saridkel, and found burnt brick, water tanks, pottery, coins, cooper and iron tools. They discovered urn burials with copper and gold ornaments in Khuntitola village near the site. They found the ruins of a stone Shiva temple, Shiva linga and a stone bull in a nearby village. The gold coin was of Huvishka type. Sarat Chandra Roy investigated it in 1915. He found redware potsherds, ancient bricks, copper hooks, rods, coins, iron arrow heads, chisels, nails and ploughshares, gold ear ornaments and stone beads on the site. Ancient sites are located around the 20 villages in the region, such as Khunti tola and Kunjala. The sites of Kunjala exhibited redware pottery with coarse fabric, and the urn burial in Khunti tola exhibited red ware pottery with coarse fabric, copper and iron tools. Roy called it an Asura fort. Amalananda Ghosh visited the site in 1944. Brahmi inscriptions were found that date to 3rd century BCE.

== Excavations ==
Saridkel site was excavated in 2004. It revealed two settlement periods that belonged to the same culture. Early settlements had use of baked bricks, charcoal, iron slag and sand, suggesting iron smelting. Period II suggested building activities. Walls were found with the use of backing bricks of size 41 x 26 x 7 cm on the periphery of mounds aligned with the river to protect the settlement. Wheels made pottery found and characterized by coarse fabric with thick section and red colour. The pottery was of redware, and grey, black, and red slipware. The ledged lid, flat-based bowl, sprinkler, and incised decorated design suggest a Kushan influence.

Iron objects with large iron slags were found. Copper objects, hooks and rods, clay sealings, copper coins, terracotta, hop-scotches, terracotta human and animal figurines, beads of chalcedony, agate and carnelian and a two-legged saddle quern were found. A Sivalinga and Yoni was also discovered. The carbon dating of these materials gave dates of 20 BC to 100 AD. Well-fortified buildings suggest it was probably a royal house or monastery belonging to the 1st or 2nd century CE.

Excavation at Urn burial sites in Khuntitola exhibited red ware pottery with coarse fabrics, copper ornaments and beads of stone and copper. A tiny metal sculpture of a man with two bulls was also discovered. Excavation at Kunjala exhibited burnt bricks of 22 x 6 cm and 44 x 23 x 5.5 cm length and buildings of four rooms. The largest room was 5 x 4 x 0.15 meters and the smallest was 2.5 meters with a veranda. Red ware pottery with coarse fabrics and terracotta red in colour was found. It dated to the early centuries CE.
