= Rania block =

Rania
- Community development block
- Coordinates: 22.779302°N 85.104546°E
- Country: India
- State: Jharkhand
- District: Khunti

Government
  - Type: Federal democracy

Area
  - Total: 267.38 km^{2} (103.24 sq mi)

Population (2011)
  - Total: 39,349
  - Density: 147.17/km^{2} (381.16/sq mi)

Languages
  - Official: Hindi, Urdu
- Time zone: UTC+5:30 (IST)
- PIN: 835216
- Telephone/STD code: 06528
- Vehicle registration: JH 23
- Literacy: 65.77
- Lok Sabha constituency: Khunti
- Vidhan Sabha constituency: Torpa
- Website: khunti.nic.in

Rania block (also spelled Raniya) is a CD block that forms an administrative division in the Khunti Sadar subdivision of Khunti district, in the Indian state of Jharkhand.

== History ==
Khunti subdivision was formed in Ranchi district in 1905 and Khunti district was created on 12 September 2007.

== Maoist activities ==
Hemant Soren, Chief Minister of Jharkhand, has claimed, in September 2021, that effective action against left wing extremism has reduced the active involvement of such groups to only a few areas that includes the tri-junction of Khunti, Seraikela Kharsawan and West Singhbhum districts. Khunti has been a Maoist-hit district. Well co-ordinated efforts by Jharkhand police, including community policing programmes in remote areas, have shown positive results.

== Geography ==
Khunti district occupies a part of the Ranchi Plateau with hills and undulating terrain. A major part of the district is in the altitude range of 500–700 metres (1,600–2,300 ft), with up to ± 200 m for some parts.

Rania CD block is bounded by Torpa CD block on the north, Gudri and Anandpur CD blocks in West Singhum district on the east and south, and Bano CD block in Simdega district and Kamdara CD block in Gumla district on the west.

Rania CD block has an area of 267.38 km^{2}.Rania police station serves Rania CD block. The headquarters of Rania CD block is located at Rania village.

== Demographics ==
=== Population ===
According to the 2011 Census of India, Rania CD block had a total population of 39,349, all of which were rural. There were 19,638 (50%) males and 19,711 (50%) females. Population in the age range 0–6 years was 6,597. Scheduled Castes numbered 1,142 (2.90%) and Scheduled Tribes numbered 27,330 (69.46%).

=== Literacy ===
According to the 2011 census, the total number of literate persons in Rania CD block was 21,547 (65.77% of the population over 6 years) out of which males numbered 12,337 (75.70% of the male population over 6 years) and females numbered 9,210 (55.97% of the female population over 6 years). The gender disparity (the difference between female and male literacy rates) was 19.72%.

As of 2011 census, literacy in Khunti district was 64.51%. Literacy in Jharkhand was 67.63% in 2011. Literacy in India in 2011 was 74.04%.

See also – List of Jharkhand districts ranked by literacy rate

Literacy in CD Blocks of
Khunti district
Khunti Sadar subdivision
Karra – 62.04%
Torpa – 71.18%
Rania – 65.77%
Murhu – 63.42%
Khunti – 58.40%
Arki – 54.21%
Source: 2011 Census: CD block Wise
Primary Census Abstract Data

=== Language and religion ===
Religion in Rania CD block (2011)
Christianity	42.82%
Hinduism	31.78%
Sarna	23.37%
Islam	1.85%
Other or not stated	0.17%

Hindi is the official language in Jharkhand and Urdu has been declared as an additional official language.

Languages in Rania CD block (2011)
1. Mundari (65.3%)
2. Sadri (32.6%)
3. Hindi (0.91%)
4. Other (1.23%)

Scheduled Tribes numbered 389,626 and formed 73.25% of the total population of Khunti district in 2011. Within the scheduled tribes the more populous tribes were (percentage of ST population in 2011 in brackets): Munda, Patars (83.66%), Oraon, Dhangars (8.52%), Lohras (3.85%), Chik Baraik (0.65%) and Mahli (0.46). Other smaller tribal groups were Bhumij, Banjara, Chero, Khond and Kol. “The place has been in recorded annals of history for its long drawn struggle against the British under the aegis of Birsa Munda, the revolutionary hero of Jharkhand.”

== Rural poverty ==
60-70% of the population of Ranchi district, of which the present Khunti district was then a part, were in the BPL category in 2004–2005. In 2011–12, the proportion of BPL population in Khunti district came down to 35.45%. According to a study in 2013 (modified in 2019), "the incidence of poverty in Jharkhand is estimated at 46%, but 60% of the scheduled castes and scheduled tribes are still below poverty line."

== Economy ==
=== Livelihood ===
Livelihood
in Rania CD block
1. Cultivators (78.5%)
2. Agricultural labourers (8.68%)
3. Household industries (2.63%)
4. Other Workers (10.2%)

In Rania CD block in 2011, amongst the class of total workers, cultivators numbered 18,014 and formed 78.46%, agricultural labourers numbered 1,993 and formed 8.68%, household industry workers numbered 603 and formed 2.63% and other workers numbered 2,349 and formed 10.23%. Total workers numbered 22,959 and formed 58.35% of the total population, and non-workers numbered 16,390 and formed 41.65% of the population.

=== Infrastructure ===
There are 66 inhabited villages in Rania CD block. In 2011, 5 villages had power supply. x villages had tap water (treated/ untreated), 57 villages had well water (covered/ uncovered), 66 villages had hand pumps, and all villages have drinking water facility. 5 villages had post offices, 4 villages had sub post offices, 4 villages had telephones (land lines), 37 villages had mobile phone coverage. 66 villages had pucca (paved) village roads, 21 villages had bus service (public/ private), 2 villages had autos/ modified autos, 3 villages had taxi/ vans, 16 villages had tractors. 8 villages had bank branches, 5 villages had agricultural credit societies, 8 villages had public library and reading rooms, 30 villages had public distribution system, 35 villages had assembly polling stations.

== Education ==
Rania CD block had 18 villages with pre-primary schools, 63 villages with primary schools, 31 villages with middle schools, 5 villages with secondary schools, 1 village with senior secondary school, 3 villages had no educational facility.
.*Senior secondary schools are also known as Inter colleges in Jharkhand

== Healthcare ==
Rania CD block had 1 village with primary health centre, 14 villages with primary health subcentres, 3 villages with maternity and child welfare centres, 4 villages with allopathic hospitals, 2 villages with veterinary hospitals, 4 villages with family welfare centres, 10 villages with medicine shops.
.*Private medical practitioners, alternative medicine etc. not included
