= Birsa Munda Tribal University =

- Type: Public
- Established: 1 April 2017
- Affiliations: UGC
- Chancellor: Governor of Gujarat
- Vice-Chancellor: Dr. Madhukarbhai S. Padvi
- Location: Narmada, Gujarat, India; 21.857243°N 73.543365°E
- Campus: Urban
- Website: http://bmtu.ac.in/

- Location within Gujarat Location within India

Birsa Munda Tribal University is a university at Rajpipla, Narmada in the Indian state of Gujarat. Established on 4 Oct 2014, after its formal inauguration by the then Minister of State for Tribal Welfare, Shabdasharan Tadvi.

== History ==
Birsa Munda Tribal University in the tribal dominated Rajpipla, Narmada district about 1km from Narmada.

== Academics ==
University offers graduation, courses covering the subjects of Arts, Commerce, Science,
