= Puran (caste) =

Caste group of East India

- Classification: OBC
- Country: India
- Original state: Odisha, West Bengal, Jharkhand

Puran (Bhanja Puran or Tamudia Puran) is a caste group of East India. They are primarily inhabitants of the states of Odisha, West Bengal and Jharkhand. They are currently considered a Other Backward Class, but Jharkhand and Odisha government proposed to include them in the Scheduled Tribes list. They speak Puran Bhasa, which is a blend of Tamaria and Odia language. As per 2011 census the language recorded 12,375 speaker in India.
