= Torpa block =

Torpa
- Community development block
- Coordinates: 22.932302°N 85.093446°E
- Country: India
- State: Jharkhand
- District: Khunti

Government
  - Type: Federal democracy

Area
  - Total: 445.33 km^{2} (171.94 sq mi)

Population (2011)
  - Total: 92,911
  - Density: 208.63/km^{2} (540.36/sq mi)

Languages
  - Official: Hindi, Urdu
- Time zone: UTC+5:30 (IST)
- PIN: 835227
- Telephone/STD code: 06528
- Vehicle registration: JH 23
- Literacy: 64.51%
- Lok Sabha constituency: Khunti
- Vidhan Sabha constituency: Torpa
- Website: khunti.nic.in

Torpa block is a CD block that forms an administrative division in the Khunti Sadar subdivision of Khunti district, in the Indian state of Jharkhand.

== History ==
Khunti subdivision was formed in Ranchi district in 1905 and Khunti district was created on 12 September 2007.

== Maoist activities ==
Hemant Soren, Chief Minister of Jharkhand, has claimed, in September 2021, that effective action against left wing extremism has reduced the active involvement of such groups to only a few areas that includes the tri-junction of Khunti, Seraikela Kharsawan and West Singhbhum districts. Khunti has been a Maoist-hit district. Well co-ordinated efforts by Jharkhand police, including community policing programmes in remote areas, have shown positive results.

== Geography ==
Khunti district occupies a part of the Ranchi Plateau with hills and undulating terrain. A major part of the district is in the altitude range of 500–700 metres (1,600–2,300 ft), with up to ± 200 m for some parts.

Torpa CD block is bounded by Karra CD block on the north, Murhu CD block on the east, Gudri CD block in West Singhbhum district and Rania CD block on the south, and Kamdara CD block in Gumla district on the west.

Torpa CD block has an area of 445.33 km^{2}.Torpa police station serves Torpa CD block. The headquarters of Torpa CD block is located at Torpa town.

== Demographics ==
=== Population ===
According to the 2011 Census of India, Torpa CD block had a total population of 92,991, of which 84,399 were rural and 8,592 were urban. There were 46,272 (50%) males and 46,719 (50%) females. Population in the age range 0–6 years was 14,569. Scheduled Castes numbered 3,752 (4.03%) and Scheduled Tribes numbered 68,030 (73.16%).

The only census town in Torpa CD block is (2011 population figure in brackets): Torpa (8,592).

=== Literacy ===
According to the 2011 census, the total number of literate persons in Torpa CD block was 55,822 (71.18% of the population over 6 years) out of which males numbered 31,244 (80.22% of the male population over 6 years) and females numbered 24,578 (62.26% of the female population over 6 years). The gender disparity (the difference between female and male literacy rates) was 17.96%.

As of 2011 census, literacy in Khunti district was 64.51%. Literacy in Jharkhand was 67.63% in 2011. Literacy in India in 2011 was 74.04%.

See also – List of Jharkhand districts ranked by literacy rate

Literacy in CD Blocks of
Khunti district
Khunti Sadar subdivision
Karra – 62.04%
Torpa – 71.18%
Rania – 65.77%
Murhu – 63.42%
Khunti – 58.40%
Arki – 54.21%
Source: 2011 Census: CD block Wise
Primary Census Abstract Data

=== Language and religion ===
Religion in Torpa CD block (2011)
Christianity	41.13%
Sarna	31.94%
Hinduism	23.89%
Islam	2.76%
Other or not stated	0.29%

Hindi is the official language in Jharkhand and Urdu has been declared as an additional official language.

Languages in Torpa CD block (2011)
1. Mundari (67.2%)
2. Sadri (24.6%)
3. Hindi (5.22%)
4. Urdu (1.14%)
5. Other (1.89%)

Scheduled Tribes numbered 389,626 and formed 73.25% of the total population of Khunti district in 2011. Within the scheduled tribes the more populous tribes were (percentage of ST population in 2011 in brackets): Munda, Patars (83.66%), Oraon, Dhangars (8.52%), Lohras (3.85%), Chik Baraik (0.65%) and Mahli (0.46). Other smaller tribal groups were Bhumij, Banjara, Chero, Khond and Kol. “The place has been in recorded annals of history for its long drawn struggle against the British under the aegis of Birsa Munda, the revolutionary hero of Jharkhand.”

== Rural poverty ==
60-70% of the population of Ranchi district, of which the present Khunti district was then a part, were in the BPL category in 2004–2005. In 2011-12, the proportion of BPL population in Khunti district came down to 35.45%. According to a study in 2013 (modified in 2019), "the incidence of poverty in Jharkhand is estimated at 46%, but 60% of the scheduled castes and scheduled tribes are still below poverty line."

== Economy ==
=== Livelihood ===
Livelihood
in Torpa CD block
1. Cultivators (66.8%)
2. Agricultural labourers (16.4%)
3. Household industries (3.62%)
4. Other Workers (13.1%)

In Torpa CD block in 2011, amongst the class of total workers, cultivators numbered 26,511 and formed 66.81%, agricultural labourers numbered 6,529 and formed 16.45%, household industry workers numbered 1,438 and formed 3.62% and other workers numbered 5,205 and formed 13.12%. Total workers numbered 39,683 and formed 42.67% of the total population, and non-workers numbered 53,308 and formed 57.33% of the population.

=== Infrastructure ===
There are 94 inhabited villages in Torpa CD block. In 2011, 24 villages had power supply. 5 villages had tap water (treated/ untreated), 94 villages had well water (covered/ uncovered), 94 villages had hand pumps, and all villages have drinking water facility. 10 villages had post offices, 6 villages had sub post offices, 5 villages had telephones (land lines), 33 villages had mobile phone coverage. 94 villages had pucca (paved) village roads, 22 villages had bus service (public/ private), 5 villages had autos/ modified autos, 12 villages had taxi/ vans,40 villages had tractors. 4 villages had bank branches, 6 villages had agricultural credit societies, 2 villages had public library and reading rooms, 59 villages had public distribution system, 41 villages had assembly polling stations.

== Education ==
Torpa CD block had 17 villages with pre-primary schools, 75 villages with primary schools, 32 villages with middle schools, 6 villages with secondary schools, 1 village with senior secondary school, 18 villages had no educational facility.
.*Senior secondary schools are also known as Inter colleges in Jharkhand

== Healthcare ==
Torpa CD block had 4 villages with primary health centres, 14 villages with primary health subcentres, 6 villages with allopathic hospitals, 1 village with veterinary hospitals, 5 villages with medicine shops.
.*Private medical practitioners, alternative medicine etc. not included
