= Tamar Assembly constituency =

Constituency of the Jharkhand legislative assembly in India

Coordinates: 23.05°N 85.65°E

Tamar
- Constituency No. 58 for the Jharkhand Legislative Assembly

Constituency details
- Country: India
- Region: East India
- State: Jharkhand
- District: Ranchi
- Lok Sabha constituency: Khunti
- Established: 2000
- Total electors: 206,595
- Reservation: ST

Member of Legislative Assembly
- 5th Jharkhand Legislative Assembly
- Incumbent Vikas Kumar Munda
- Party: JMM
- Alliance: MGB
- Elected year: 2024

Tamar Assembly constituency is an assembly constituency in the Indian state of Jharkhand.

Most successful parties after separate Jharkhand state.
1. JD(U) (33.3%)
2. JMM (33.3%)
3. JP (16.7%)
4. AJSU (16.7%)

== Members of the Legislative Assembly ==
Election	Member	Party
Bihar Legislative Assembly
1952	Naiyaran Munda	Jharkhand Party
1957	Dhan Singh Munda	Jharkhand Party
1962	Dhan Singh Munda	Janata Party
1967	B. R. Munda	Indian National Congress
1969	Anirudh Patar	Bharatiya Jana Sangh
1972	Banmali Singh Munda	Indian National Congress
1977	Anirudh Patar	Janata Party
1980	Tiru Muchirai Munda	Indian National Congress
1985	Tiru Muchirai Munda	Indian National Congress
1990	Tiru Muchirai Munda	Indian National Congress
1995	Kali Charan Munda	Indian National Congress
2000	Ramesh Singh Munda	Samata Party
Jharkhand Legislative Assembly
2005	Ramesh Singh Munda	Janata Dal
2009^	Gopal Krishna Patar	Jharkhand Party
2009	Gopal Krishna Patar	Janata Dal
2014	Vikash Kumar Munda	All Jharkhand Students Union
2019	Vikash Kumar Munda	Jharkhand Mukti Morcha
2024	Vikash Kumar Munda	Jharkhand Mukti Morcha

^by-election

== Election results ==
=== Assembly election 2024 ===
2024 Jharkhand Legislative Assembly election: Tamar
Party	Candidate	Votes	%	±%
JMM	Vikash Kumar Munda	65,655	40.28	▲1.06
JD(U)	Gopal Krishna Patar	41,409	25.40	New
JLKM	Damayanti Munda	26,562	16.30	New
CPI(M)	Suresh Munda	5,030	3.09	New
Independent	Singrai Tuti	4,801	2.95	New
Independent	Sachin Patar	3,985	2.44	New
BAP	Prem Shankar Shahi Munda	3,915	2.40	New
NOTA	None of the Above	972	0.60	▼0.04
Margin of victory		24,246	14.87	▼7.02
Turnout		1,63,001	74.55	▲6.07
Registered electors		2,18,637		▲5.83
JMM hold		Swing	▲1.06	

=== Assembly election 2019 ===
2019 Jharkhand Legislative Assembly election: Tamar
Party	Candidate	Votes	%	±%
JMM	Vikash Kumar Munda	55,491	39.22	▲37.12
AJSU	Ram Durlav Singh Munda	24,520	17.33	▼25.54
BJP	Reeta Devi	18,082	12.78	New
NCP	Gopal Krishna Patar	16,517	11.67	New
JVM(P)	Prem Shankar Shahi Munda	4,225	2.99	▼1.94
Independent	Prakash Chandra Oraon	3,725	2.63	New
Jharkhand Party	Kundan Pahan	2,932	2.07	New
NOTA	None of the Above	899	0.64	▼2.38
Margin of victory		30,971	21.89	▲2.48
Turnout		1,41,476	68.48	▼2.43
Registered electors		2,06,595		▲9.36
JMM gain from AJSU		Swing	▼3.65	

=== Assembly election 2014 ===
2014 Jharkhand Legislative Assembly election: Tamar
Party	Candidate	Votes	%	±%
AJSU	Vikash Kumar Munda	57,428	42.87	▲10.14
Independent	Gopal Krishna Patar	31,422	23.46	New
INC	Prakash Chandra Oraon	18,479	13.79	▼0.06
JVM(P)	Mahadev Ravinath Pahan	6,605	4.93	New
JMM	Salomi Tuti	2,821	2.11	▼3.94
Independent	Mangal Singh Munda	2,398	1.79	New
CPI(ML)L	Lakhimani Devi	2,228	1.66	▲0.11
NOTA	None of the Above	4,034	3.01	New
Margin of victory		26,006	19.41	▲17.76
Turnout		1,33,965	70.91	▲16.93
Registered electors		1,88,918		▲14.28
AJSU gain from JD(U)		Swing	▲8.49	

=== Assembly election 2009 ===
2009 Jharkhand Legislative Assembly election: Tamar
Party	Candidate	Votes	%	±%
JD(U)	Gopal Krishna Patar	30,678	34.38	▲8.85
AJSU	Vikash Kumar Munda	29,207	32.73	New
INC	Ram Dayal Munda	12,359	13.85	▼0.70
JMM	Nishikant Oraon	5,391	6.04	New
Independent	Sita Ram Munda	2,445	2.74	New
Communist Party of India (Marxist Leninist) Liberation	Shukdev Munda	1,390	1.56	New
Independent	Sukhram Munda	1,150	1.29	New
Margin of victory		1,471	1.65	▼5.14
Turnout		89,240	53.98	▲1.21
Registered electors		1,65,315		▲0.35
JD(U) hold		Swing	▲8.85	

=== Assembly election 2005 ===
2005 Jharkhand Legislative Assembly election: Tamar
Party	Candidate	Votes	%	±%
JD(U)	Ramesh Singh Munda	22,195	25.53	New
Independent	Gopal Krishna Patar	16,295	18.74	New
Independent	Jagannath Singh Munda	12,944	14.89	New
INC	Kali Charan Munda	12,647	14.55	▼7.71
CPI(M)	Rajendra Singh Munda	6,262	7.20	▲2.15
Jharkhand Party	Samuel Purty	3,673	4.22	▼2.24
Independent	Rajendra Munda	2,007	2.31	New
Margin of victory		5,900	6.79	▼16.52
Turnout		86,944	52.78	▲0.32
Registered electors		1,64,740		▲5.85
JD(U) gain from SAP		Swing	▼20.04	

=== Assembly election 2000 ===
2000 Bihar Legislative Assembly election: Tamar
Party	Candidate	Votes	%	±%
SAP	Ramesh Singh Munda	37,196	45.56	New
INC	Kalicharan Munda	18,167	22.25	New
JMM	Lakhind Singh Munda	10,538	12.91	New
Jharkhand Party	Mohan Lal Patar Munda	5,281	6.47	New
CPI(M)	Budhan Lal Munda	4,128	5.06	New
Communist Party of India (Marxist Leninist) Liberation	Kaleshwar Munda	3,751	4.59	New
Independent	Purnachandra Munda	1,298	1.59	New
Margin of victory		19,029	23.31	
Turnout		81,633	53.34	
Registered electors		1,55,631		
SAP win (new seat)				

== See also ==
- Vidhan Sabha
- List of states of India by type of legislature
