= Ulihatu =

- Village
- Location in Jharkhand, India Ulihatu (India)
- Coordinates: 22.983032°N 85.491256°E
- Country: India
- State: Jharkhand
- District: Khunti

Government
  - Type: Federal democracy

Population (2011)
  - Total: 1,126

Languages *
  - Official: Hindi, Urdu
- Time zone: UTC+5:30 (IST)
- PIN: 835232
- Telephone/ STD code: 06528
- Vehicle registration: JH 23
- Literacy: 72.51%
- Lok Sabha constituency: Khunti
- Vidhan Sabha constituency: Tamar
- Website: khunti.nic.in

Ulihatu is a village in the Arki CD block in the Khunti Sadar subdivision of the Khunti district in the Indian state of Jharkhand.

== Geography ==
Cities, towns and locations in Khunti district in South Chotanagpur Division
M: municipality, CT: census town, R: rural/ urban centre, T: tourist centre
Owing to space constraints in the small map, the actual locations in a larger map may vary slightly

=== Location ===
Ulihatu is located at 22.983032°N 85.491256°E

The place is surrounded by hills. It is 40 km from Khunti and 30 km from Murhu.

=== Area overview ===
In the adjacent map the area shown is "undulating and covered with hills, hillocks and jungles (jungles/ forests are shown as shaded area in the map). The soil of the area is rocky, sandy and red loam upland. There are paddy fields only in the depressions. It has a gentle slope adjacent to the streams." A major part of the district is in the altitude range of 500–700 metres (1,600–2,300 ft), with up to ± 200 m for some parts. In 2011, it had a density of population of 210 persons per sq km. Khunti is an overwhelmingly rural district with 91.5% of the population living in rural areas. Famous places in this area are Ulihatu, the birth place of Bhagwan Birsa Munda, and Dombari Buru, the central point of his activity.

Note: The map alongside presents some of the notable locations in the district. All places marked in the map are linked in the larger full screen map.

== Historical significance ==
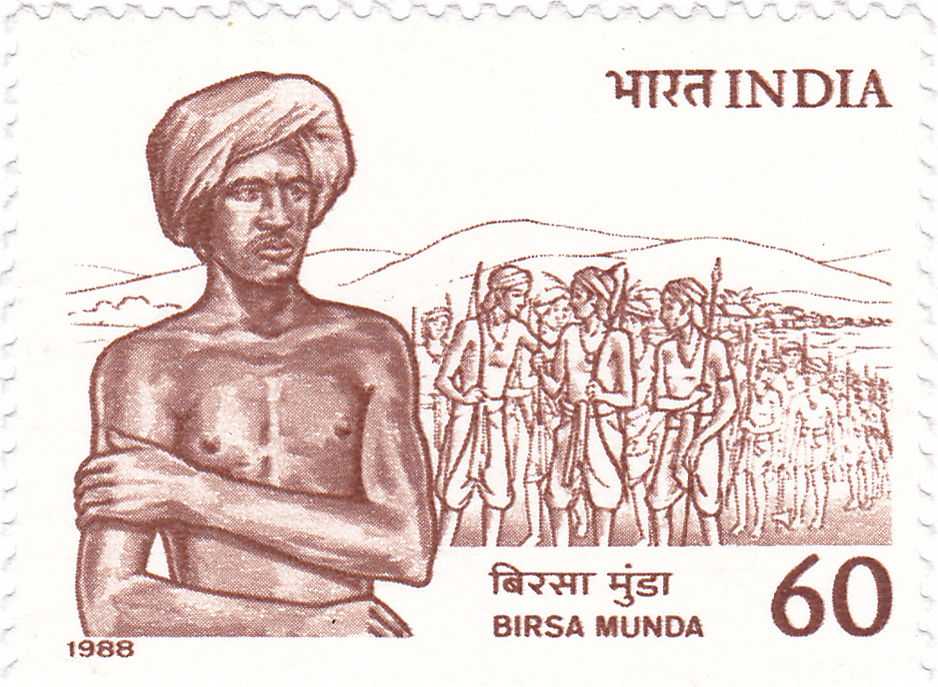
Birsa Munda on a 1988 stamp of India

Bhagwan Birsa Munda, freedom fighter, religious leader and tribal icon was born on 15 November 1875 at Ulihatu. He is the only tribal leader whose portrait adorns the central hall of the Indian parliament.

== Dombari Buru ==
Dombari Buru, a picturesque hill close to Ulihatu, "had turned red with blood when Birsa Munda led his legendary ulgulan (rebellion) against the British more than a century ago"

Many years ago padmasri Dr.Ramdayal Munda and others made a huge pillar in memory of 9 January 1900 dombari buru incident.

== Demographics ==
According to the 2011 Census of India, Ulihatu had a total population of 1,126, of which 675 (60%) were males and 451 (40%) were females. Population in the age range 0–6 years was 191. The total number of literate persons in Ulihatu was 678 (72.51% of the population over 6 years).

(*For language details see Arki block#Language and religion)
