= Khunti =

- Town
- Location in Jharkhand, India Khunti (India)
- Coordinates: 23.081026°N 85.277446°E
- Country: India
- State: Jharkhand
- District: Khunti
- Elevation: 611 m (2,005 ft)

Population (2011)
  - Total: 36,390

Languages
  - Official: Hindi, Nagpuri, Mundari,
- Time zone: UTC+5:30 (IST)
- PIN: 835210
- Telephone code: 06528
- Vehicle registration: JH-23
- Website: http://khunti.nic.in/

Khunti is the headquarter of Khunti district in the Indian state of Jharkhand. It is in South Chotanagpur division and one of the 24 districts in the Indian state of Jharkhand. The district of Khunti was carved out of Ranchi district on 12 September 2007. It is historically known as the centre of activity of the Birsa movement. As of 2011, it is the second least populous district of Jharkhand (out of 24), after Lohardaga. The district is a part of the Red Corridor.

== Geography ==
Cities, towns and locations in Khunti district in South Chotanagpur Division
M: municipality, CT: census town, R: rural/ urban centre, T: tourist centre
Owing to space constraints in the small map, the actual locations in a larger map may vary slightly

=== Location ===
Khunti is located at 23.081026°N 85.277446°E.

=== Area overview ===
In the adjacent map the area shown is “undulating and covered with hills, hillocks and jungles (jungles/ forests are shown as shaded area in the map). The soil of the area is rocky, sandy and red loam upland. There are paddy fields only in the depressions. It has a gentle slope adjacent to the streams.” A major part of the district is in the altitude range of 500–700 metres (1,600–2,300 ft), with up to ± 200 m for some parts. In 2011, it had a density of population of 210 persons per km^{2}. Khunti is an overwhelmingly rural district with 91.5% of the population living in rural areas. Famous places in this area are Ulihatu, the birthplace of Bhagwan Birsa Munda, and Dombari Buru, the central point of his activity.

Note: The map alongside presents some of the notable locations in the district. All places marked in the map are linked in the larger full screen map.

== Demographics ==
As of 2011 India census, Khunti had a population of 36,390. Males constitute 52% of the population and females 48%. Khunti has an average literacy rate of 83.12%, higher than the national average of 73.00%: male literacy is 88.65%, and female literacy is 77.39%. In Khunti, 13.09% of the population is under 6 years of age.

== Politics ==
| District | No. | Constituency | Name | Party | Alliance | Remarks | Khunti | 59 | Torpa | Sudeep Gudhiya |
| 60 | Khunti | Ram Surya Munda | | | | | Khunti | | | |

== See also ==
- Khunti district
