= Birsa Munda =

Indian tribal freedom fighter and religious leader (1875–1900)

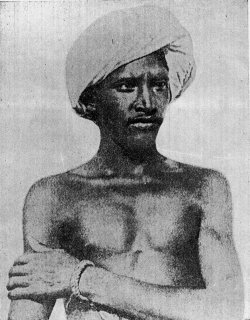
- Photograph from S. C. Roy's The Mundas and their Country
- Born: 15 November 1875; Ulihatu, Ranchi district, Bengal Presidency (present-day Khunti district, Jharkhand)
- Died: 9 June 1900 (aged 24); Ranchi, Bengal Presidency (present-day Jharkhand)
- Movement: Indian independence movement
- Parents: Sugana Munda (father); Karmi Hatu (mother)

Birsa Munda (15 November 1875 – 9 June 1900) was an Indian tribal independence activist, and folk hero who belonged to the Munda tribe. He spearheaded a tribal religious millenarian movement that arose in the Bengal Presidency (now Jharkhand) in the late 19th century, during the British Raj, thereby making him an important figure in the history of the Indian independence movement. The revolt mainly concentrated in the Munda belt of Khunti, Tamar, ,Sarwada and Bandgaon.

Birsa received his education in Salga under the guidance of his teacher Jaipal Nag. Later, Birsa converted to Christianity to join the German Mission School. After dropping out of school, Birsa Munda created a faith called Birsait. Members of the Munda community soon started joining the faith which in turn became a challenge for the British activities. The Birsaits openly declared that the real enemies were the British and Christian missionaries. The cause of the Munda revolt was the 'unfair land grabbing practices by colonial and local authorities that demolished the tribal conventional land system'. Birsa Munda is known for challenging the British Christian missionaries and revolting against the conversion activities along with the Munda and Oraon communities. His portrait hangs in the Indian Parliament Museum.

== Early life (1875–1886) ==
Birsa Munda's song in Kurukh

Birsa Munda was born on 15 November 1875, His birthplace is in the village of Ulihatu in Ranchi district of Bengal Presidency – now in Khunti district of Jharkhand – on a Thursday (Some sources claim he was born on 18 July 1872, and not in 1875) and hence named after that day, according to the then prevalent Munda custom. The folk songs reflect popular confusion and refer to Ulihatu or Chalkad as his birthplace. Ulihatu was the birthplace of Sugana Munda, father of Birsa. The claim of Ulihatu rests on Birsa's elder brother Komta Munda living in the village, where his house still exists albeit in a dilapidated condition.

Birsa's father, mother Karmi Hatu, and younger brother, Pasna Munda, left Ulihatu and proceeded to Kurumbda, near Birbanki, in search of employment as labourers (sajhedari) or crop-sharers (ryots). At Kurumbda, Birsa's elder brother, Komta, and his sister, Daskir, were born. From there the family moved to Bamba where Birsa's elder sister Champa was born.

Birsa's early life were spent with his parents at Chalkad. His early life could not have been very different from that of an average Munda child. Folklore refers to his rolling and playing in sand and dust with his friends, and his growing up strong and handsome in looks; he grazed sheep in the forest of Bohonda. When he grew up, he shared an interest in playing the flute, in which he became an expert. He went around with the tuila, the one-stringed instrument made from the pumpkin, in his hand and the flute strung to his waist. Exciting moments of his childhood were spent on the akhara (the village wrestling ground). However, one of his ideal contemporaries and who went out with him heard him speak of strange things.

Due to his poverty Birsa was taken to Ayubhatu, his maternal uncle's village. Komta Munda, his eldest brother, who was ten years of age, went to Kundi Bartoli, entered the service of a Munda, married and lived there for eight years, and then joined his father and younger brother at Chalkad. Birsa lived at Ayubhatu for two years. He went to school at Salga, run by one Jaipal Nag. He accompanied his mother's younger sister, Joni, who was fond of him, when she was married, to Khatanga, her new home. He came in contact with a Christian missionary who visited a few families in the village which had been converted to Christianity. Birsa Munda understood very soon that Christian missionaries were converting tribals to Christianity. Birsa soon started to challenge the Christian missionaries and revolted against the conversion activities along with the Munda and Oraon communities.

As Birsa was sharp in his studies, Jaipal Nag recommended him to join the German Mission School and Birsa converted to Christianity, after that he was renamed as Birsa David, which later became Birsa Daud. After studying for a few years, he left the German Mission School.

== Formative period (1886–1894) ==
Birsa's living at Chaibasa from 1886 to 1890 constituted a formative period of his life. This period was marked by the German and Roman Catholic Christian agitation. In light of the independence struggle, Sugana Munda withdrew his son from school. Soon after leaving Chaibasa in 1890 Birsa and his family gave up their membership in the German mission, ceased being Christian, and reverted to his original traditional tribal religious system.

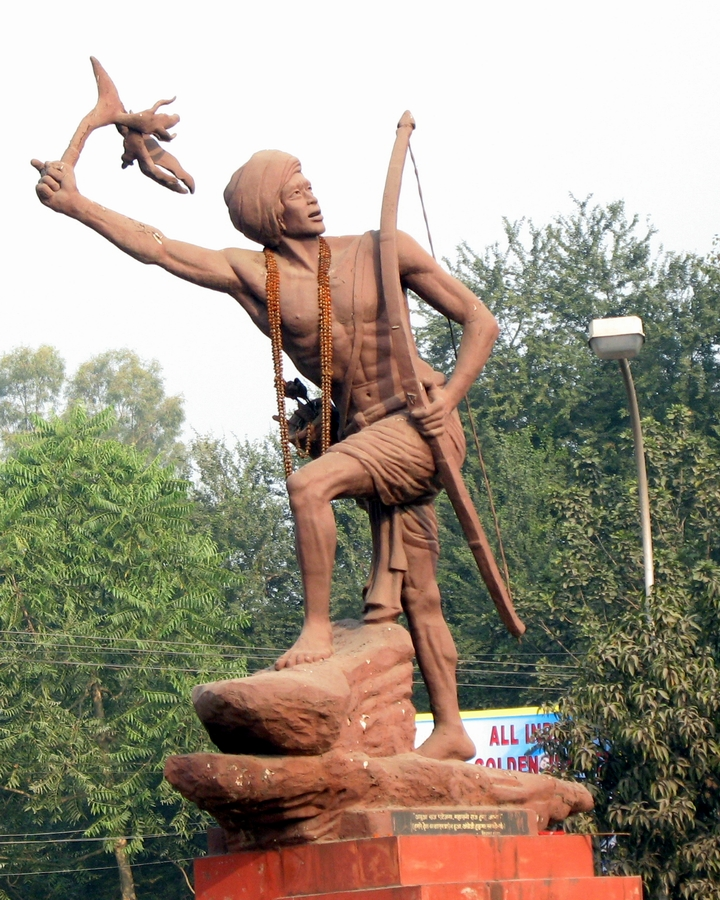
Birsa Munda statue by Nabhendu Sen at Naya More, Bokaro Steel City, Jharkhand

He left Gerbera in the wake of the mounting Sardar agitation. He participated in the agitation stemming from popular disaffection at the restrictions imposed upon the traditional rights of the Mundas in the protected forest, under the leadership of Gideon of Piring in the Porhat area. During 1893–94 all waste lands in villages, the ownership of which was vested in the Government, were constituted into protected forests under the Indian Forest Act VII of 1882. In West Singhbhum as in Lohardaga, the forest settlement operations were launched and measures were taken to determine the rights of the forest-dwelling communities. Villages in forests were marked off in blocks of convenient size consisting of village sites and cultivable wastelands sufficient for the needs of villages. In 1894, Birsa had grown up into a strong young man, shrewd and intelligent, and undertook the work of repairing the Dombari tank at Gerbera damaged by rains.

While on a sojourn in the neighbourhood of village Sankara in West Singhbhum district, he found a suitable companion, presented her parents with jewels, and explained his idea of marriage. Later, on his return from jail, he did not find her faithful to him and left her. Another woman who served him at Chalkad was the sister of Mathias Munda. On his release from prison, the daughter of Mathura Munda of Koensar who was kept by Kali Munda, and the wife of Jaga Munda of Jiuri insisted on becoming wives of Birsa. He rebuked them and referred the wife of Jaga Munda to her husband. Another rather well-known woman who stayed with Birsa was Sali of Burundi.

Birsa stressed monogamy at a later stage in his life. Birsa rose from the lowest ranks of the peasants, the ryots, who unlike their namesakes elsewhere enjoyed far fewer rights in the Mundari khuntkatti system; while all privileges were monopolized by the members of the founding lineage, the ryots were no better than crop-sharers. Birsa's experience as a young boy, driven from place to place in search of employment, gave him insight into the agrarian question and forest matters; he was no passive spectator but an active participant in the movement going on in the neighbourhood.

== Revival of tribal religion ==
Birsa is credited for reviving the traditional tribal culture which was mostly negatively affected by British Christian missionary works. Many tribals under his sect had already converted to Christianity. He opposed and criticised the Church and its practices such as levying of taxes and religious conversions. In 1895, Birsa is said to have seen a vision of a supreme God. He himself became a preacher and a representative of their traditional tribal religion, and soon, he built up a reputation of a healer, a miracle-worker, and a preacher. The Mundas, Oraons, and Kharias flocked to Chalkad to see him and to be cured of their ailments. Both the Oraon and Munda population up to Barwari and Chechari became convinced Birsaities. Contemporary and later folk songs commemorate the tremendous impact of Birsa on his people, their joy, and expectations at his advent. The name of Dharti Aaba was on everybody's lips.

Birsa Munda started to advise tribal people to pursue their original traditional tribal religious system. Impressed by his teachings, he became a saintly figure to the tribal people and they sought his blessings.

== Tribal movement ==
Birsa Munda's slogan threatening the British Raj – Abua raj ete jana, maharani raj tundu jana ("Let the kingdom of the queen be ended and our kingdom be established") – is still remembered in areas of Jharkhand, Odisha, Bihar, West Bengal and Madhya Pradesh.

The British colonial system intensified the transformation of the tribal agrarian system into a feudal state. As the tribals with their primitive technology could not generate a surplus, the non-tribal peasantry was invited by the chiefs in Chhotanagpur to settle on and cultivate the land. This led to the alienation of the lands held by the tribals. The new class of Thikadars was of a more rapacious kind and eager to make the most of their possessions.

In 1856 Jagirs stood at about 600, and they held from a village to 150 villages. But by 1874, the authority of the old Munda or Oraon chiefs had been almost entirely annulled by that of the farmers, introduced by the landlords. In some villages, they had completely lost their proprietary rights and had been reduced to the position of farm labourers.

To the twin challenges of agrarian breakdown and culture change, Birsa along with the Munda responded through a series of revolts and uprisings under his leadership. In 1895, in Chalkad village of Tamar, Birsa Munda renounced Christianity, asked his fellow tribesmen to worship only one God and give up the worship of bongas.

He declared himself a prophet who had come to recover the lost kingdom of his people. He said that the reign of Queen Victoria was over and the Munda Raj had begun. He gave orders to the raiyats (tenant farmers) to pay no rents. The Mundas called him Dharati Baba, the father of earth.

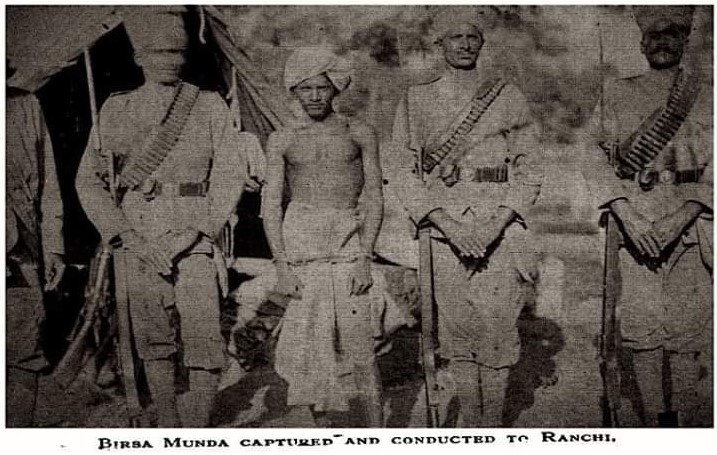
Birsa Munda captured and conducted to Ranchi(1895).

Due to a rumor that those who didn't follow Birsa would be massacred, Birsa was arrested on 24 August 1895 and sentenced to two-year imprisonment. On 28 January 1898, after being released from jail he went with his followers to Chutia to collect the record and to re-establish racial links with the temple. He said that the temple belonged to the Kols. The Christian missionaries wanted to arrest Birsa and his followers, who were threatening their ability to make converts. Birsa went underground for two years but attended a series of secret meetings.

It is said that around 7000 men and women assembled around Christmas of 1899, to herald the Ulgulaan (Great Tumult) which soon spread to Khunti, Tamar, Basia, and Ranchi. The Anglican Mission at Murhu and the Roman Catholic Mission at Sarwada were the main targets. The Birsaits openly declared that the real enemies were the British and not Christian Mundas and called for a decisive war against the British. He allegedly urged the killing of Thikadars, Jagirdars, Rajas, Hakims and Christians and promised that the guns and bullets would turn to water. For two years, they attacked places loyal to the British.

On Christmas Eve of 1899, Birsa's followers tried to burn down churches in Ranchi and Singhabhum. On 5 January 1900, Birsa's followers killed two police constables at Etkedih. On 7 January, they attacked the Khunti police station, killing a constable and razing the houses of local shopkeepers. The local commissioner, A. Fobes, and deputy commissioner, H.C. Streattfield, rushed to Khunti with a force of 150 men to suppress the growing rebellion. The colonial administration also set a reward of Rs 500 for Birsa. The troops under the command of Fobes and Streattfield attacked and defeated Munda's guerillas at Dumbari Hill, though Munda himself escaped to the Singhbum hills.

He was arrested at Jamkopai forest in Chakradharpur on 3 February 1900. According to Deputy commissioner Ranchi, vide letter, 460 tribals were made accused in 15 different criminal cases, out of which 63 were convicted. One was sentenced to death, 39 to transportation for life and 23 to imprisoned for terms up to fourteen years. There were six deaths, including that of Birsa Munda in the prison during trials. Birsa Munda died in jail on 9 June 1900. After his death, the movement faded out. In 1908, the colonial government introduced the Chotanagpur Tenancy Act (CNT), which prohibits the transfer of tribal land to non-tribals.

Birsa Munda's arrest was a major achievement for the British. On 6 February 1900, Bengal’s Lieutenant Governor informed the Home Department via telegram. On 8 February the news was shared with Sir Arthur Godley in London. Earlier, on 9 January 1900, police fired on Birsa's supporters at Sail Rakab Hill in Dumari, but the death toll remains unknown.

== Legacy ==
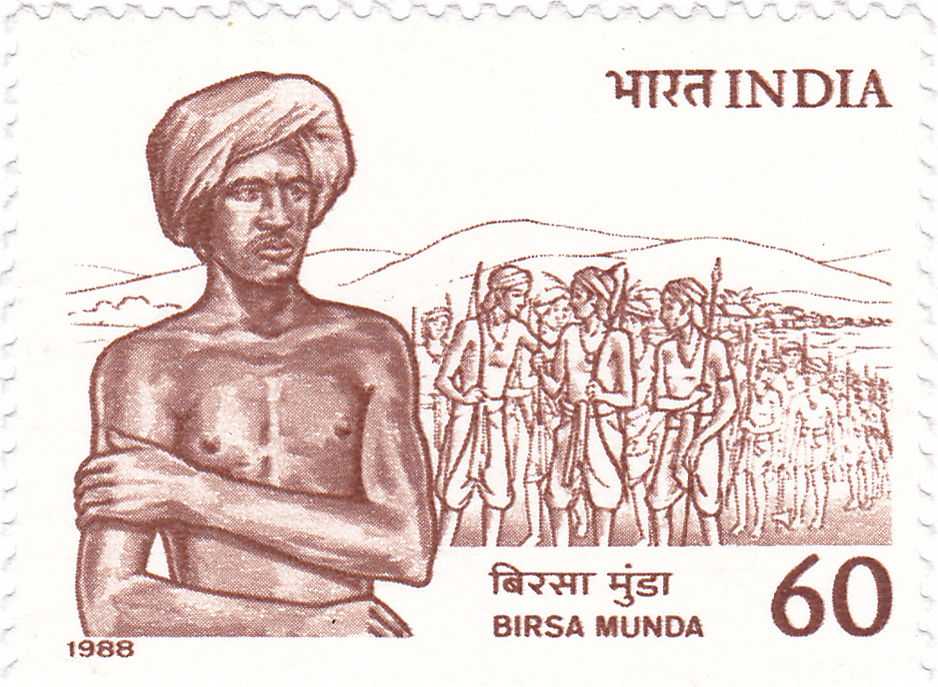
Birsa Munda on a 1988 daak ticket of India post

The Union cabinet, at a meeting held on 10 November 2021, voted to observe 15 November, Birsa Munda's birth anniversary, as Janjatiya Gaurav Divas, to remember the contribution of tribal independence activist. His birth anniversary is still celebrated by tribal people as far away as Mysore and Kodagu districts in Karnataka. The official celebration takes place at his samadhi sthal in the Kokar neighbourhood of Ranchi, the capital of Jharkhand.

Today, there are several organizations, bodies, and structures named after him, notably Birsa Munda Airport Ranchi, Birsa Institute of Technology Sindri, Birsa Munda International Hockey Stadium Rourkela (World's largest Hockey Stadium), Birsa Munda Vanvasi Chattravas, Kanpur, Sidho Kanho Birsha University, Purulia, Birsa Munda Government Medical College, Shahdol, and Birsa Agricultural University. The war cry of Bihar Regiment is Birsa Munda Ki Jai (Victory to Birsa Munda). A neighborhood in Jamshedpur was named Birsanagar to honor him.

The Statue of Ulgulan is a proposed 150-foot-tall statue of Birsa Munda to be built in Jharkhand with stones collected from households in the region.

Ulgulan, the annual college festival of the National University of Study and Research in Law, in Ranchi, is inspired by the independence struggle of Birsa Munda.

Gopi Nainar, the director of Aramm, is set to direct a movie, in Tamil, on the life of Birsa Munda. Well known Tamil director and anti-caste activist Pa. Ranjith will direct a Hindi movie which is based on Birsa Munda's life.

=== Commemoration ===
He is commemorated in the names of the following institutions and organizations:

- Birsa Agricultural University
- Birsa Institute of Technology
- Birsa College, Khunti
- Birsa Institute of Technology Sindri
- Sido Kanhu Murmu University, Dumka
- Sidho Kanho Birsha University
- Birsa Munda Athletics Stadium
- Birsa Munda Airport
- Birsa Munda Central Jail
- Birsa Seva Dal, a controversial defunct organization
- Birsa Munda Tribal University
- Birsa Munda International Hockey Stadium

== In popular culture ==
In 2004, a Hindi film, Ulgulan-Ek Kranti (The Revolution) was made by Ashok Saran. Deepraj Rana played Birsa Munda in the film, and 500 Birsaits (followers of Birsa) appeared as extras. Another film, Birsa Munda – The Black Iron Man, by Rajesh Mittal was released the same year.

In 2008, a Hindi film based on the life of Birsa, Gandhi Se Pehle Gandhi (Gandhi Before Gandhi), was directed by Iqbal Durrani, based on his own novel of the same name. Bhagwan Birsa Munda, an Indian biographical short film by Rajan Khosa, was released in 2020.

Ramon Magsaysay Award winner, writer-activist Mahasweta Devi's historical fiction, Aranyer Adhikar (Right to the Forest, 1977), a novel for which she won the Sahitya Akademi Award for Bengali in 1979, is based on his life and the Munda Rebellion against the British Raj in the late 19th century; she later wrote an abridged version, Birsa Munda, specifically for young readers.

A folk song commemorating Birsa Munda
