= Khunti district =

Coordinates: 23°04′12″N 85°16′48″E

- District of Jharkhand
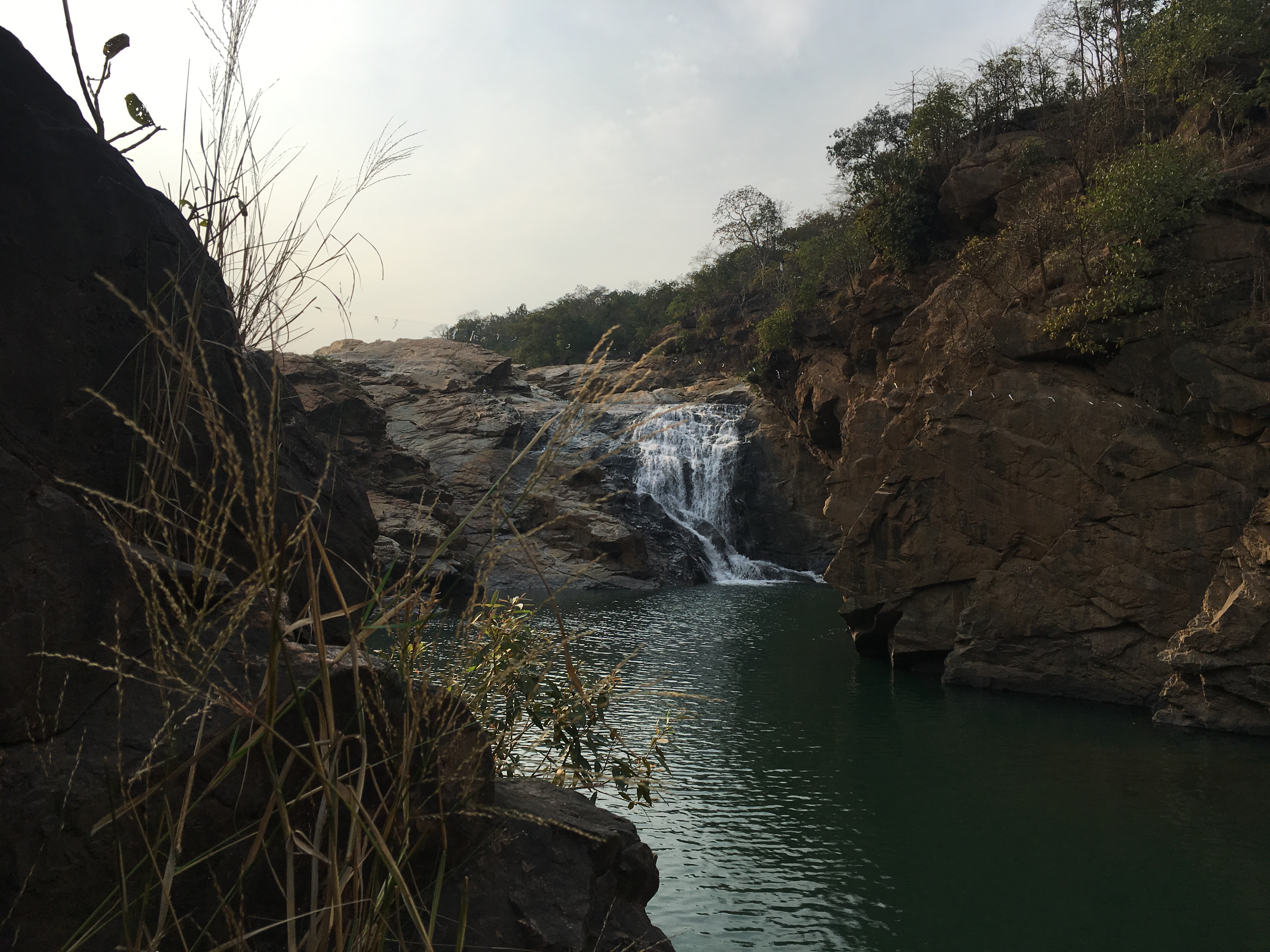
- Perua Gagh falls
- Interactive map of Khunti district
- Country: India
- State: Jharkhand
- Division: South Chotanagpur
- Headquarters: Khunti

Government
  - Deputy Commissioner: Shri. Lokesh Mishra (IAS)
  - Lok Sabha constituencies: Khunti (shared with Simdega, Ranchi and Seraikela Kharsawan districts)
  - Vidhan Sabha constituencies: Torpa, Khunti

Area
  - Total: 2,535 km^{2} (979 sq mi)

Population (2011)
  - Total: 531,885
  - Density: 209.8/km^{2} (543.4/sq mi)

Demographics
  - Literacy: 63.86%
  - Sex ratio: 994
- Time zone: UTC+05:30 (IST)
- Vehicle registration: JH-23
- Website: khunti.nic.in

Khunti district is one of the twenty-four districts in South Chotanagpur division of the Indian state of Jharkhand. The district of Khunti was carved out of Ranchi district on 12 September 2007. As of 2011, it is the second least populous district of Jharkhand (out of 24), after Lohardaga. Khunti town is the headquarters of the district. It is historically known as the birthplace of Birsa Munda, and being the centre of activity of the Birsa movement. It is the part of State Capital Region (SCR).

The district is currently a part of the Red Corridor.

== History ==
In ancient site of Saridkel, burnt bricks houses, red ware pottery, copper tools, coins and iron tools found which are belongs to early centuries CE.

== Administration ==
Khunti district has one sub-division and 6 blocks. The district is headed by Deputy Commissioner (DC). The Khunti sub-division is the only sub-disvision in the district headed by the SDM.

=== Blocks/Mandals ===
Khunti district has six community development blocks:

1. Arki block
2. Khunti block
3. Murhu block
4. Rania block
5. Torpa block
6. Karra block

== Demographics ==
Historical population
Year	Pop.	±%
1901	155,506	—
1911	181,651	+16.8%
1921	174,763	−3.8%
1931	205,234	+17.4%
1941	219,412	+6.9%
1951	243,744	+11.1%
1961	270,551	+11.0%
1971	309,590	+14.4%
1981	334,112	+7.9%
1991	386,330	+15.6%
2001	434,819	+12.6%
2011	531,885	+22.3%
Source: Census of India

Religions in Khunti district (2011)
Religion	Percent
Sarna	45.37%
Hinduism	26.11%
Christianity	25.65%
Islam	2.47%
Other or not stated	0.41%

As of 2011 census of India, Khunti district has a population of 531,885, roughly equal to the nation of Cape Verde. This gives it a ranking of 541st in India (out of a total of 640). The district has a population density of 210 inhabitants per square kilometre (540/sq mi). Its population growth rate over the decade 2001-2011 was 21.96%. Khunti has a sex ratio of 994 females for every 1000 males, and a literacy rate of 63.86%. 8.46% of the population lives in urban areas. Scheduled Castes and Scheduled Tribes collectively account for 77.77% (SC 4.52% and ST 73.25%) of the district's total population. The prominent communities in this group, in terms of the district's total population, was Munda (61.28%), Oraon (6.24%), Lohra (2.82%), Ghasi (1.46%), Pan/Sawasi (0.96%), Bhogta (0.85%), Chik Baraik (0.48%), Mahli (0.34%), Turi (0.3%), and Dhobi (0.22%). Additionally, communities such as Dom, Binjhia, Chamar/Mochi, Santal, Bhuiya, Bedia, Kharia, Kharwar, Kora, Gorait, Ho, and Musahar also has populations ranging between one thousand to a hundred.

Languages of Khunti district (2011)
1. Mundari (61.7%)
2. Sadri (27.8%)
3. Hindi (5.78%)
4. Panchpargania (2.90%)
5. Others (1.81%)

At the time of the 2011 Census of India, 61.72% of the population in the district spoke Mundari, 27.79% Sadri, 5.78% Hindi and 2.90% Panchpargania as their first language.

== Local places ==
Panchghagh waterfall has 5 streams to it. The Banai River branches itself out in five different streams, generating rivulets through the cluster of rocks.

Anganbari –Shiva Temple is a religious center of the district known for its Shiva Temple. Every year during Sawan season local festival is celebrate for one month long. On Maha-shivratri Day, temple is visited by many disciples from different regions of Jharkhand. It is located on Khunti-Torpa road 9 km from the district headquarters.

Dombari Buru rises above Sail Rakab village close to Ulihatu. It is in the hills of Dombari Buru where Birsa Munda led his legendary ulgulan (rebellion) against the British more than a century ago. It is located 50 km from the state capital.

== Politics ==
District	No.	Constituency	Name	Party	Alliance	Remarks	Khunti	59	Torpa	Sudeep Gudhiya
60	Khunti	Ram Surya Munda					Khunti			
