= Khunti Lok Sabha constituency =

Constituency of the Indian parliament in Jharkhand

Coordinates: 23.07°N 85.28°E

Khunti JH-11
- Lok Sabha constituency
- Interactive map of Khunti Lok Sabha constituency

Constituency details
- Country: India
- Region: East India
- State: Jharkhand
- Assembly constituencies: Kharsawan; Tamar; Torpa; Khunti; Simdega; Kolebira
- Established: 1952
- Reservation: ST

Member of Parliament
- 18th Lok Sabha
- Incumbent Kali Charan Munda
- Party: INC
- Alliance: INDIA
- Elected year: 2024
- Preceded by: Arjun Munda

Khunti Lok Sabha constituency is one of the fourteen Lok Sabha (parliamentary) constituencies in Jharkhand state in eastern India. This constituency is reserved for candidates belonging to scheduled tribes. This constituency covers all of Khunti and Simdega districts and parts of Ranchi and Seraikela Kharsawan districts.

== Assembly segments ==
The Khunti Lok Sabha constituency comprises the following six Vidhan Sabha (legislative assembly) segments, all of which are reserved for scheduled tribes:

#	Name	District	Member	Party	2024 Lead
57	Kharsawan (ST)	Seraikela Kharsawan	Dashrath Gagrai	JMM	INC
58	Tamar (ST)	Ranchi	Vikas Kumar Munda	JMM	INC
59	Torpa (ST)	Khunti	Sudeep Gudhiya	JMM	INC
60	Khunti (ST)	Khunti	Ram Surya Munda	JMM	INC
70	Simdega (ST)	Simdega	Bhushan Bara	INC	INC
71	Kolebira (ST)	Simdega	Naman Bixal Kongari	INC	INC

== Members of Parliament ==
Year	Name	Party
1951-52	Jaipal Singh Munda	Jharkhand Party
1957	Jaipal Singh Munda	Jharkhand Party
1962	Jaipal Singh Munda	Jharkhand Party
1967	Jaipal Singh Munda	Indian National Congress
1971	Niral Enem Horo	Indian National Congress
1977	Kariya Munda	Janata Party
1980	Niral Enem Horo	Jharkhand Party
1984	Simon Tigga	Indian National Congress
1989	Kariya Munda	Bharatiya Janata Party
1991	Kariya Munda	Bharatiya Janata Party
1996	Kariya Munda	Bharatiya Janata Party
1998	Kariya Munda	Bharatiya Janata Party
1999	Kariya Munda	Bharatiya Janata Party
2004	Sushila Kerketta	Indian National Congress
2009	Kariya Munda	Bharatiya Janata Party
2014	Kariya Munda	Bharatiya Janata Party
2019	Arjun Munda	Bharatiya Janata Party
2024	Kali Charan Munda	Indian National Congress

== Election results ==
=== 2024 ===
2024 Indian general election: Khunti
Party	Candidate	Votes	%	±%
INC	Kali Charan Munda	511,647	54.62	▲8.20
BJP	Arjun Munda	3,61,972	38.64	▼7.43
NOTA	None of the above	21,919	2.34	▼0.25
Majority		1,49,675	15.98	▲15.81
Turnout		9,40,247	70.73	
INC gain from BJP		Swing		

=== 2019 ===
2019 Indian general elections: Khunti
Party	Candidate	Votes	%	±%
BJP	Arjun Munda	382,638	45.97	+9.48
INC	Kali Charan Munda	3,81,193	45.80	+25.87
NOTA	None of the Above	21,245	2.55	−0.68
IND.	Meenakshi Munda	10,989	1.32	+1.32
Jharkhand Party	Ajay Topno	8,838	1.06	−22.93
BSP	Indumati Mundu	7,663	0.92	N/A
Majority		1,445	0.17	−12.33
Turnout		8,32,834	69.25	
BJP hold		Swing		

=== 2014 ===
2014 Indian general elections: Khunti
Party	Candidate	Votes	%	±%
BJP	Kariya Munda	269,185	36.49	
Jharkhand Party	Anosh Ekka	1,76,937	23.99	
INC	Kalicharan Munda	1,47,017	19.93	
AJSU	Neil Tirkey	27,158	3.68	
JVM(P)	Basant Kumar Longa	24,514	3.32	
NOTA	None of the Above	23,816	3.23	
Majority		92,248	12.50	
Turnout		7,37,611	66.34	
BJP hold		Swing		

=== 2009 ===
2009 Indian general elections: Khunti
Party	Candidate	Votes	%	±%
BJP	Kariya Munda	210,214	41.19	
INC	Neil Tirkey	1,30,039	25.48	
Jharkhand Party	Nishikant Horo	84,025	16.46	
Majority		80,175	15.71	
Turnout		5,10,343	52.03	
BJP gain from INC		Swing		

== See also ==
- Khunti district
- Simdega district
- List of constituencies of the Lok Sabha
