= Kolebira Assembly constituency =

Constituency of the Jharkhand legislative assembly in India

Coordinates: 22.700°N 84.694°E

Kolebira
- Constituency No. 71 for the Jharkhand Legislative Assembly

Constituency details
- Country: India
- Region: East India
- State: Jharkhand
- District: Simdega
- Lok Sabha constituency: Khunti
- Established: 2000
- Total electors: 196,667
- Reservation: ST

Member of Legislative Assembly
- 6th Jharkhand Legislative Assembly
- Incumbent Naman Bixal Kongari
- Party: INC
- Alliance: MGB
- Elected year: 2024

Kolebira Assembly constituency is an assembly constituency in the Indian state of Jharkhand.

Most successful parties after separate Jharkhand state.
1. JP (50.0%)
2. INC (50.0%)

== Members of the Legislative Assembly ==
Election	Name	Party
Bihar Legislative Assembly
1952	Sushil Bage	Jharkhand Party
1957	Sushil Bage	Jharkhand Party
1962	Sushil Bage	Janata Party
1967	N. E. Horo	Independent politician
1969	Sushil Bage	Independent politician
1972	Sushil Bage	All India Jharkhand Party
1977	Birsing Munda	Jan Kranti Dal
1980	Sushil Bage	Indian National Congress
1985	Birsing Munda	Independent politician
1990	Theodore Kiro	Indian National Congress
1995	Basant Kumar Longa	Jharkhand Mukti Morcha
2000	Theodore Kiro	Indian National Congress
Jharkhand Legislative Assembly
2005	Anosh Ekka	Jharkhand Party
2009	Anosh Ekka	Jharkhand Party
2014	Anosh Ekka	Jharkhand Party
2018^	Naman Bixal Kongari	Indian National Congress
2019	Naman Bixal Kongari	Indian National Congress
2024	Naman Bixal Kongari	Indian National Congress

^by-election

== Election results ==
=== Assembly election 2024 ===
2024 Jharkhand Legislative Assembly election: Kolebira
Party	Candidate	Votes	%	±%
INC	Naman Bixal Kongari	75,376	51.86	▲13.69
BJP	Sujan Jojo	38,345	26.38	▼2.09
Jharkhand Party	Vibhav Sandesh Ekka	18,878	12.99	▼1.71
Independent	Richard Tirkey	3,333	2.29	New
Independent	Rosalia Shanta Kandulna	1,570	1.08	New
Independent	Bernard Kandulna	1,321	0.91	New
JLKM	Punit Kumar	892	0.61	New
NOTA	None of the Above	499	0.34	▼1.51
Margin of victory		37,031	25.48	▲15.78
Turnout		1,45,351	69.20	▲4.49
Registered electors		2,10,037		▲6.80
INC hold		Swing	▲13.69	

=== Assembly election 2019 ===
2019 Jharkhand Legislative Assembly election: Kolebira
Party	Candidate	Votes	%	±%
INC	Naman Bixal Kongari	48,574	38.17	▲4.24
BJP	Sujan Jojo	36,236	28.47	▲2.67
Jharkhand Party	Ireen Ekka	18,700	14.69	▲0.86
RSP	Anil Kandulna	14,351	11.28	New
BSP	Surendra Singh	1,810	1.42	New
Independent	Shivchan Manghi	1,526	1.20	New
Independent	Pyara Mundu	1,474	1.16	New
NOTA	None of the Above	2,353	1.85	New
Margin of victory		12,338	9.69	▲1.57
Turnout		1,27,264	64.71	▲1.71
Registered electors		1,96,667		▲4.15
INC hold		Swing	▲4.24	

=== Assembly by-election 2018 ===
2018 Jharkhand Legislative Assembly by-election: Kolebira
Party	Candidate	Votes	%	±%
INC	Naman Bixal Kongari	40,355	33.92	▲25.27
BJP	Basant Soreng	30,690	25.80	▲0.07
RSP	Anil Kandulna	23,802	20.01	New
Jharkhand Party	Menon Ekka	16,455	13.83	▼25.75
Margin of victory		9,665	8.12	▼5.73
Turnout		1,18,954	63.00	▼2.66
Registered electors		1,88,829		▲0.20
INC gain from Jharkhand Party		Swing	▼5.66	

=== Assembly election 2014 ===
2014 Jharkhand Legislative Assembly election: Kolebira
Party	Candidate	Votes	%	±%
Jharkhand Party	Anosh Ekka	48,978	39.59	▲10.71
BJP	Manoj Nagesiya	31,835	25.73	▲4.37
JMM	Louis Kujur	17,083	13.81	▲9.21
INC	Theodore Kiro	10,714	8.66	▼4.86
ABJP	Patras Surin	5,027	4.06	New
GGP	Alphons Munda	2,045	1.65	▼4.93
Independent	Ismail Kerketta	1,951	1.58	New
NOTA	None of the Above	3,398	2.75	New
Margin of victory		17,143	13.86	▲6.34
Turnout		1,23,723	65.66	▲2.79
Registered electors		1,88,443		▲18.62
Jharkhand Party hold		Swing	▲10.71	

=== Assembly election 2009 ===
2009 Jharkhand Legislative Assembly election: Kolebira
Party	Candidate	Votes	%	±%
Jharkhand Party	Anosh Ekka	28,834	28.87	▲3.44
BJP	Mahendra Bhagat	21,332	21.36	New
INC	Benjamin Lakra	13,499	13.52	▼8.71
Independent	Louis Kujur	8,214	8.23	New
GGP	Alfons Munda	6,575	6.58	New
JMM	Basant Kumar Longa	4,595	4.60	New
Independent	Bernard Kandulna	2,948	2.95	New
Margin of victory		7,502	7.51	▲4.31
Turnout		99,863	62.86	▼0.27
Registered electors		1,58,862		▼25.14
Jharkhand Party hold		Swing	▲3.44	

=== Assembly election 2005 ===
2005 Jharkhand Legislative Assembly election: Kolebira
Party	Candidate	Votes	%	±%
Jharkhand Party	Enos Ekka	34,067	25.43	▲12.23
INC	Theodore Kiro	29,781	22.23	▼22.89
Independent	Chatur Baraik	6,625	4.95	New
JD(U)	Jagarnath Baraik	3,694	2.53	New
Independent	Isidor Kerketta	3,395	2.33	New
Jai Jawan Jai Kisan Mazdoor Congress	Baldeo Singh	2,930	2.01	New
Independent	Mangal Jadiya	2,683	1.84	New
Margin of victory		4,286	3.20	▼9.24
Turnout		1,33,969	63.13	▲7.29
Registered electors		2,12,216		▲51.62
Jharkhand Party gain from INC		Swing	▼19.69	

=== Assembly election 2000 ===
2000 Bihar Legislative Assembly election: Kolebira
Party	Candidate	Votes	%	±%
INC	Theodore Kiro	35,266	45.12	New
BJP	Nirmal Kumar Besra	25,544	32.68	New
Jharkhand Party	Susil Dang	10,315	13.20	New
Independent	Sylvia Bage	2,206	2.82	New
JMM	Basant Kumar Longa	1,407	1.80	New
RJD	Onil Tirkey	1,168	1.49	New
Independent	Petamber Kandeyang	634	0.81	New
Margin of victory		9,722	12.44	
Turnout		78,159	57.23	
Registered electors		1,39,970		
INC win (new seat)				

== See also ==
- Simdega district
- Kolebira block
- Vidhan Sabha
- List of states of India by type of legislature
