= 1937 Bihar Legislative Assembly election =

Election in British India

The 1937 Bihar Legislative Assembly election was held in January 1937 as part of the broader 1937 Indian provincial elections introduced under the Government of India Act 1935. It marked the establishment of the Bihar Legislative Assembly with expanded powers and provincial autonomy. The election resulted formation of Dr. Sri Krishna Singh led Congress governments after briefly Mohammad Yunus led interim government.

In the province of Bihar, the Act established a bicameral legislature, comprising the Legislative Assembly (lower house) and the Legislative Council (upper house). The Legislative Assembly consisted of 152 members, elected through a system of separate electorates with communal and socio-economic divisional representation in colonial Bihar. The poll conducted in January 22 to 28.

== Result ==
Party wise result
Party	Seats
Indian National Congress	92
Depressed Classes League	3
Muslim Independent Party	16
United Party	6
Ahrar Party	3
No-Party (Note: Candidates were formally unaffiliated at the time of the election but later joined or allied with other parties.)	32
Total	152

=== Constituency wise leads ===
Region	Constituency			Elected Candidate	Party	Alliance (Note: Alliances during the Sinha ministry.)
Region	No.	Name	Type	Elected Candidate	Party	Alliance
Patna Division	1	Patna Division Landholders	Landholders	Sir Ganesh Datta Singh	No-Party	Coalition Party
Patna Division	2	Patna City	General	Sarangdhar Sinha	Indian National Congress	Indian National Congress
Patna Division	3	Patna Division	General	Jagat Narayan Lal	Indian National Congress	Indian National Congress
Patna Division	4	Patna Central	General	Indra Dewan Saran Singh	Indian National Congress	Indian National Congress
Patna Division	5	Dinapore	General	Shyam Nandan Sinha	Indian National Congress	Indian National Congress
Patna Division	6	Barh	General	Sheel Bhadra Yajee	Indian National Congress	Indian National Congress
Patna Division	7	Bihar East	General	Shyam Narayan Singh	Indian National Congress	Indian National Congress
Patna Division	8	Bihar East	General (reserved for Scheduled Castes)	Ram Prashad	Indian National Congress	Indian National Congress
Patna Division	9	Gaya South	General	Birendra Bahadur Sinha	Indian National Congress	Indian National Congress
Patna Division	10	Gaya South	General (reserved for Scheduled Castes)	Sukhari Ram Madhubarat	Indian National Congress	Indian National Congress
Patna Division	11	Aurangabad	General	Anugrah Narayan Sinha	Indian National Congress	Indian National Congress
Patna Division	12	Nawadah	General	Jamuna Prashad Sinha	Indian National Congress	Indian National Congress
Patna Division	13	Nawadah	General (reserved for Scheduled Castes)	Bundi Ram	Depressed Classes League	Indian National Congress
Patna Division	14	Gaya North	General	Jugal Kishor Narayan Sinha	Indian National Congress	Indian National Congress
Patna Division	15	Buxar	General	Hargovind Misra	Indian National Congress	Indian National Congress
Patna Division	16	Bhabua	General	Gupteshwar Pandey	Indian National Congress	Indian National Congress
Patna Division	17	Shahabad North-East	General	Harinandan Singh	Indian National Congress	Indian National Congress
Patna Division	18	Shahabad Central East	General	Budhan Rai Varma	Indian National Congress	Indian National Congress
Patna Division	19	Shahabad Central East	General (reserved for Scheduled Castes)	Jagjiwan Ram	Depressed Classes League	Indian National Congress
Patna Division	20	Sasaram	General	Harihar Sinha	Indian National Congress	Indian National Congress
Patna Division	21	Patna City	Muhammadan	Saiyid Abdul Aziz		Muslim League
Patna Division	22	Patna Division	Muhammadan	Hafiz Zafar Hasan		Indian National Congress
Patna Division	23	Patna West	Muhammadan	Muhammad Yunus	Muslim Independent Party	Muslim Independent Party
Patna Division	24	Patna East	Muhammadan	Sharfuddin Hasan	Muslim Independent Party	Muslim Independent Party
Patna Division	25	Gaya East	Muhammadan	Saiyid Najmul Hasan	United Party	Coalition Party
Patna Division	26	Gaya West	Muhammadan	Muhammad Latifur Rahman	United Party	Coalition Party
Patna Division	27	Shahabad	Muhammadan	Chaudhuri Sharafat Hussain	Muslim Independent Party	Muslim Independent Party
Patna Division	28	Patna	General Women	Kamakhya Devi	Indian National Congress	Indian National Congress
Patna Division	29	Patna City	Muhammadan Women	Anis Imam	No-Party	Coalition Party
Tirhut Division	30	Tirhut Division Landholders	Landholders	Chandreshwar Prasad Narayan Sinha	No-Party	Coalition Party
Tirhut Division	31	Tirhut Division	General	Vindhyeshwari Prasad Varma	Indian National Congress	Indian National Congress
Tirhut Division	32	Saran Sadr West	General	Birendh Dutta Sinha	Indian National Congress	Indian National Congress
Tirhut Division	33	Saran Sadr East	General	Dwarka Nath Tiwari	Indian National Congress	Indian National Congress
Tirhut Division	34	Siwan North-East	General	Narayan Prasad Sinha	Indian National Congress	Indian National Congress
Tirhut Division	35	Siwan South-West	General	Shiveshvar Prashad Narayan Sinha Sharma	Indian National Congress	Indian National Congress
Tirhut Division	36	Gopalganj-cum-Mashrakh and Marhaura East	General	Prabhunath Sinha	Indian National Congress	Indian National Congress
Tirhut Division	37	Gopalganj West	General	Gobindpati Tiwari		Coalition Party
Tirhut Division	38	Gopalganj West	General (reserved for Scheduled Castes)	Ram Basawan Rabidas	Depressed Classes League	Indian National Congress
Tirhut Division	39	Champaran Sadr North-West	General	Ganesh Prashad	Indian National Congress	Indian National Congress
Tirhut Division	40	Champaran Sadr East	General	Gorakh Prashad	Indian National Congress	Indian National Congress
Tirhut Division	41	Champaran Sadr South-West	General	Haribans Sahay	Indian National Congress	Indian National Congress
Tirhut Division	42	Bettiah South	General	Baidyanath Misra	Indian National Congress	Indian National Congress
Tirhut Division	43	Bettiah North	General	Vishwanath Singh	Indian National Congress	Indian National Congress
Tirhut Division	44	Bettiah North	General (reserved for Scheduled Castes)	Balgobind Bhagat	Indian National Congress	Indian National Congress
Tirhut Division	45	Muzaffarpur Sadr East	General	Mahesh Prashad Sinha	Indian National Congress	Indian National Congress
Tirhut Division	46	Muzaffarpur Sadr East	General (reserved for Scheduled Castes)	Shivanandan Pasban	Indian National Congress	Indian National Congress
Tirhut Division	47	Muzaffarpur Sadr West	General	Brijnandan Sahi	Indian National Congress	Indian National Congress
Tirhut Division	48	Sitamarhi-cum-Katra and Minapore East	General	Ramdayalu Sinha	Indian National Congress	Indian National Congress
Tirhut Division	49	Hajipur South-West	General	Rameshvar Prashad Sinha	Indian National Congress	Indian National Congress
Tirhut Division	50	Hajipur North-East	General	Dip Narayan Sinha	Indian National Congress	Indian National Congress
Tirhut Division	51	Sitamarhi North	General	Thakur Ramnandan Sinha	Indian National Congress	Indian National Congress
Tirhut Division	52	Sitamarhi West	General	Ramasis Thakur	Indian National Congress	Indian National Congress
Tirhut Division	53	Madhubani North	General	Rajendra Narayan Chaudhuri	Indian National Congress	Indian National Congress
Tirhut Division	54	Madhubani South	General	Chaturanan Das	Indian National Congress	Indian National Congress
Tirhut Division	55	Madhubani-cum-Bahera East	General	Jamuna Karjee	Indian National Congress	Indian National Congress
Tirhut Division	56	Darbhanga Sadr	General	Suraj Nandan Thakur	Indian National Congress	Indian National Congress
Tirhut Division	57	Samastipur South-East	General	Ramcharan Sinha	Indian National Congress	Indian National Congress
Tirhut Division	58	Darbhanga Sadr	General (reserved for Scheduled Castes)	Keshwar Ram	Indian National Congress	Indian National Congress
Tirhut Division	59	Samastipur North-West	General	Rajeshwar Prashad Narayan Sinha	Indian National Congress	Indian National Congress
Tirhut Division	60	Samastipur South-East	General (reserved for Scheduled Castes)	Sundar Mahto	Indian National Congress	Indian National Congress
Tirhut Division	61	Tirhut	Muhammadan	Abdul Jalil		Muslim Independent Party
Tirhut Division	62	Saran Sadr	Muhammadan	Nur Hasan	Indian National Congress	Indian National Congress
Tirhut Division	63	Siwan	Muhammadan	Muhammad Qasim	United Party	Coalition Party
Tirhut Division	64	Gopalganj	Muhammadan	Khan Bahadur Sagshirul Haqq	Ahrar Party	Ahrar Party
Tirhut Division	65	Champaran Sadr North	Muhammadan	Saiyid Mahmud	Indian National Congress	Indian National Congress
Tirhut Division	66	Champaran Sadr South	Muhammadan	Muhammad Abdul Majid	Muslim Independent Party	Muslim Independent Party
Tirhut Division	67	Bettiah	Muhammadan	Hafiz Shaikh Muhammad Sani	Muslim Independent Party	Muslim Independent Party
Tirhut Division	68	Muzaffarpur Sadr	Muhammadan	Khan Sahib Muhammad Yakub	Muslim Independent Party	Muslim Independent Party
Tirhut Division	69	Hajipur	Muhammadan	Badrul Hasan	Muslim Independent Party	Muslim Independent Party
Tirhut Division	70	Sitamarhi	Muhammadan	Tajamul Husain	Muslim Independent Party	Muslim Independent Party
Tirhut Division	71	Darbhanga North-West	Muhammadan	Ahmad Ghafoor	Indian National Congress	Indian National Congress
Tirhut Division	72	Darbhanga North-East	Muhammadan	Muhammed Shafi	Ahrar Party	Ahrar Party
Tirhut Division	73	Darbhanga South	Muhammadan	Muhammad Salim	Ahrar Party	Ahrar Party
Tirhut Division	74	Darbhanga Central	Muhammadan	Sayeedu Haq	Indian National Congress	Indian National Congress
Tirhut Division	75	Muzaffarpur Town	General Women	Sharda Kumari Devi	Indian National Congress	Indian National Congress
Bhagalpur Division	76	Bhagalpur Landholders	Landholders	Surya Mohan Thakur	No-Party	Coalition Party
Bhagalpur Division	77	Bhagalpur Division	General	Upendra Nath Mukharji	Indian National Congress	Indian National Congress
Bhagalpur Division	78	Bhagalpur Sadr South	General	Mewalal Jha	Indian National Congress	Indian National Congress
Bhagalpur Division	79	Bhagalpur Sadr-cum-Kishanganj North	General	Shivadhari Sinha	Indian National Congress	Indian National Congress
Bhagalpur Division	80	Banka	General	Harkishore Prashad	Indian National Congress	Indian National Congress
Bhagalpur Division	81	Supaul	General	Rajendra Misra	Indian National Congress	Indian National Congress
Bhagalpur Division	82	Madhipura	General	Shivanandan Prashad Mandal	Indian National Congress	Indian National Congress
Bhagalpur Division	83	Madhipura	General (reserved for Scheduled Castes)	Ram Baras Das	Indian National Congress	Indian National Congress
Bhagalpur Division	84	Monghyr Sadr South	General	Shri Krishna Sinha	Indian National Congress	Indian National Congress
Bhagalpur Division	85	Monghyr Sadr South	General (reserved for Scheduled Castes)	Raghunandan Prashad	Indian National Congress	Indian National Congress
Bhagalpur Division	86	Monghyr Sadr North	General	Nirapada Mukharji	Indian National Congress	Indian National Congress
Bhagalpur Division	87	Begusarai West	General	Ramcharitra Sinha	Indian National Congress	Indian National Congress
Bhagalpur Division	88	Begusarai East	General	Brahmadeo Narayan Singh	Indian National Congress	Indian National Congress
Bhagalpur Division	89	Jamui	General	Kalika Prashad Singh	Indian National Congress	Indian National Congress
Bhagalpur Division	90	Purnea North-West	General	Ramdin Tiwari	Indian National Congress	Indian National Congress
Bhagalpur Division	91	Purnea East	General	Kishori Lal Kundu	Indian National Congress	Indian National Congress
Bhagalpur Division	92	Purnea South-West	General	Dheer Narayan Chand	Indian National Congress	Indian National Congress
Bhagalpur Division	93	Purnea South-West	General (reserved for Scheduled Castes)	Jaglal Chaudhuri	Indian National Congress	Indian National Congress
Bhagalpur Division	94	Deoghar-cum-Jamtara	General	Binodanand Jha	Indian National Congress	Indian National Congress
Bhagalpur Division	95	Godda	General	Budhinath Jha	Indian National Congress	Indian National Congress
Bhagalpur Division	96	Santal Parganas Sadr	General	Bhagwan Chandra Das	Indian National Congress	Indian National Congress
Bhagalpur Division	97	Santal Parganas Sadr	General (reserved for Scheduled Castes)	Charan Murmu	Indian National Congress	Indian National Congress
Bhagalpur Division	98	Pakaur-cum-Rajmahal	General	Brijlall Dokania	Indian National Congress	Indian National Congress
Bhagalpur Division	99	Pakaur-cum-Rajmahal	General (reserved for Scheduled Castes)	Debu Murmu	Indian National Congress	Indian National Congress
Bhagalpur Division	100	Monghyr North	Muhammadan	Chaudhuri Muhammad Nasirul Hasan	Muslim Independent Party	Muslim Independent Party
Bhagalpur Division	101	Monghyr South	Muhammadan	Saiyid Rafiuddin Ahmad Rizvi		Muslim Independent Party
Bhagalpur Division	102	Bhagalpur Sadr-cum-Banka	Muhammadan	Muhammad Mahmud	Muslim Independent Party	Muslim Independent Party
Bhagalpur Division	103	Madhipura-cum-Supaul	Muhammadan	Saiyid Muhammad Minatullah	Muslim Independent Party	Muslim Independent Party
Bhagalpur Division	104	Araria	Muhammadan	Shaikh Ziaur Rahman	Muslim Independent Party	Muslim Independent Party
Bhagalpur Division	105	Kishanganj South	Muhammadan	Zainuddin Hasan Mirza	United Party	Coalition Party
Bhagalpur Division	106	Kishanganj North-East	Muhammadan	Muhammad Islamuddin	Muslim Independent Party	Muslim Independent Party
Bhagalpur Division	107	Kishanganj North-West	Muhammadan	Shaikh Fazlur Rahman	United Party	Coalition Party
Bhagalpur Division	108	Purnea Sadr North	Muhammadan	Muhammad Tahir		Muslim Independent Party
Bhagalpur Division	109	Purnea Sadr South-East	Muhammadan	Shaikh Shafiqul Haqq		Muslim Independent Party
Bhagalpur Division	110	Santal Parganas South	Muhammadan	Saiyid Ali Mansur	United Party	Coalition Party
Bhagalpur Division	111	Santal Parganas North	Muhammadan	Abdul Bari	Indian National Congress	Indian National Congress
Bhagalpur Division	112	Bhagalpur Town	General Women	Saraswati Devi	Indian National Congress	Indian National Congress
Bhagalpur Division	113	Bhagalpur Division	Muhammadan	Khan Bahadur Nawab Abdul Wahab Khan	No-Party	Muslim Independent Party
Chota Nagpur Division	114	Chota Nagpur Division Landholders	Landholders	Maharaj Kumar Rajkishore Nath Shah Deo	No-Party	Coalition Party
Chota Nagpur Division	115	Chota Nagpur Division	General	Jimut Bahan Sen	Indian National Congress	Indian National Congress
Chota Nagpur Division	116	Hazaribagh Central	General	Krishna Ballabh Sahay	Indian National Congress	Indian National Congress
Chota Nagpur Division	117	Hazaribagh Central	General (reserved for Scheduled Castes)	Hopna Santal	Indian National Congress	Indian National Congress
Chota Nagpur Division	118	Giridih-cum-Chatra	General	Sukhlal Singh	Indian National Congress	Indian National Congress
Chota Nagpur Division	119	Giridih-cum-Chatra	General (reserved for Scheduled Castes)	Karu Dusadh	Indian National Congress	Indian National Congress
Chota Nagpur Division	120	Ranchi Sadr	General	Devaki Nandan Prashad	Indian National Congress	Indian National Congress
Chota Nagpur Division	121	Ranchi Sadr	General (reserved for Scheduled Castes)	Ram Bhagat	Indian National Congress	Indian National Congress
Chota Nagpur Division	122	Gumla-cum-Simdega	General	Bara Lal Kandarp Nath Shah Deo		Coalition Party
Chota Nagpur Division	123	Gumla-cum-Simdega	General (reserved for Scheduled Castes)	Boniface Lakra		Coalition Party
Chota Nagpur Division	124	Khunti	General	Purna Chandra Mitra	Indian National Congress	Indian National Congress
Chota Nagpur Division	125	Palamau North-East	General	Rajkishore Sinha	Indian National Congress	Indian National Congress
Chota Nagpur Division	126	Palamau North-East	General (reserved for Scheduled Castes)	Jitu Ram	Indian National Congress	Indian National Congress
Chota Nagpur Division	127	Palamau South-West	General	Jadubans Sahay	Indian National Congress	Indian National Congress
Chota Nagpur Division	128	Manbhum South	General	Upendra Mohan Das Gupta	Indian National Congress	Indian National Congress
Chota Nagpur Division	129	Manbhum South	General	Tika Ram Manjhi	Indian National Congress	Indian National Congress
Chota Nagpur Division	130	Manbhum Central	General	Kumar Ajit Prashad Singh Deo		Coalition Party
Chota Nagpur Division	131	Manbhum Central	General (reserved for Scheduled Castes)	Gulu Dhopa		Coalition Party
Chota Nagpur Division	132	Manbhum North	General	Ambika Charan Mallik	Indian National Congress	Indian National Congress
Chota Nagpur Division	133	Singhbhum	General	Pramatha Bhattasali	Indian National Congress	Indian National Congress
Chota Nagpur Division	134	Singhbhum	General	Devendra Nath Samanta	Indian National Congress	Indian National Congress
Chota Nagpur Division	135	Singhbhum	General (reserved for Scheduled Castes)	Rasika Ho	Indian National Congress	Indian National Congress
Chota Nagpur Division	136	Hazaribagh	Muhammadan	Abdul Majid		
Chota Nagpur Division	137	Ranchi-cum-Singhbhum	Muhammadan	Shaikh Ramzan Ali		Coalition Party
Chota Nagpur Division	138	Palamau	Muhammadan	Shaikh Muhammad Hussain		Muslim Independent Party
Chota Nagpur Division	139	Manbhum	Muhammadan	Qazi Muhammad Ilyas		Muslim Independent Party
Chota Nagpur Division	140	Chota Nagpur Division	Muhammadan	Mohi-ud-din Ahmad		Coalition Party
Special Interest	141	Anglo-Indian	Anglo-Indian	A. M. Hayman	No-Party	No-Party
Special Interest	142	Patna and Tirhut-cum-Bhagalpur European	European	E. C. Danby	No-Party	
Special Interest	143	Chota Nagpur European	European	J. Richmond	No-Party	No-Party
Special Interest	144	Indian Christian	Indian Christian	Ignace Beck	No-Party	Coalition Party
Special Interest	145	The Bihar Chamber of Commerce	Commerce and Industries	Chakreshwar Kumar Jain	No-Party	No-Party
Special Interest	146	The Bihar Planters' Association	Commerce and Industries	W. H. Meyrick	No-Party	Coalition Party
Special Interest	147	The Indian Mining Association	Commerce and Industries	E. A. Paterson P. S. Keelan	No-Party	No-Party
Special Interest	148	The Indian Mining Federation	Commerce and Industries	Manindra Nath Mukharji	No-Party	No-Party
Special Interest	149	Jamshedpur Factory Labour	Labour	Natha Ram	No-Party	Coalition Party
Special Interest	150	Monghyr-cum-Jamalpur Factory Labour	Labour	Harendra Bahadur Chandra	Indian National Congress	Indian National Congress
Special Interest	151	Hazaribagh Mining Labour	Labour	Kshetra Nath Sen Gupta	No-Party	Indian National Congress
Special Interest	152	University	University	Sachchidananda Sinha	No-Party	No-Party

== Aftermath ==
=== Yunus government ===
Although the Indian National Congress formed as the largest party in the elections, it declined to form a government owing to disagreements with Governor Maurice Garnier Hallett over the exercise of his powers under the Government of India Act 1935. Hallett subsequently invited Mohammad Yunus, leader of the Muslim Independent Party, to form a government, and Yunus became Premier of Bihar on 1 April 1937.

=== Singh government ===
Shri Krishna Sinha lead assembly structure
Party	Seats
Indian National Congress	99
Coalition Party	22
Muslim Independent Party	20
Ahrar Party	3
Muslim League	2
No-Party	6
Total	152

The Congress under Shri Krishna Sinha, together with its alliance, accounted for 99 members, while the Muslim Independent Party under Mohammad Yunus had 20. The Coalition Party had 22 members, the Ahrar Party three, the Muslim League two, and six members had no party affiliation. Sinha subsequently formed a Congress ministry in Patna on 20 July 1937, following the resolution of the dispute over the Governor's powers. However, in 1939, Sinha and his colleague Anugrah Narayan Sinha resigned in protest against Governer-General Viceroy Lord Linlithgow's decision to involve India in the Second World War. Following the resignation, the Province Governor assumed the administration of Bihar under Section 93 of the Government of India Act 1935.
