= Khijri Assembly constituency =

Constituency of the Jharkhand legislative assembly in India

Coordinates: 22.799°N 84.964°E

Khijri
- Constituency No. 62 for the Jharkhand Legislative Assembly

Constituency details
- Country: India
- Region: East India
- State: Jharkhand
- District: Ranchi
- Lok Sabha constituency: Ranchi
- Established: 1967
- Reservation: ST

Member of Legislative Assembly
- 5th Jharkhand Legislative Assembly
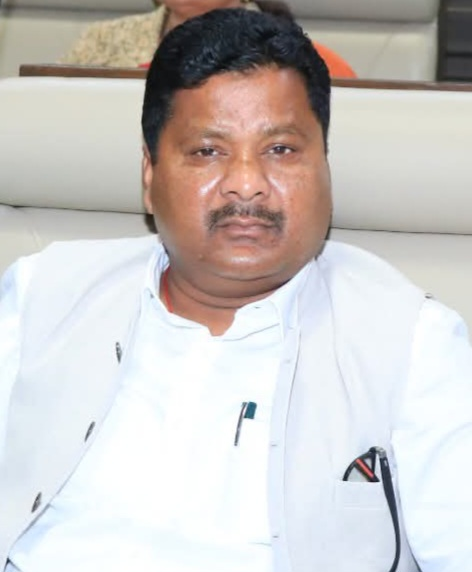
- Incumbent Rajesh Kachhap
- Party: INC
- Alliance: MGB
- Elected year: 2024

Khijri is a Legislative assembly constituency, in the Indian state of Jharkhand. It is in Ranchi district, is a part of the Ranchi Lok Sabha constituency, and is reserved for candidates of the Scheduled Tribes.

Most successful parties after separate Jharkhand state.
1. INC (60.0%)
2. BJP (40.0%)

== Members of the Legislative Assembly ==
Election	Member	Party
Bihar Legislative Assembly
Before 1967: Constituency did not exist
1967	R. L. Horo	Indian National Congress
1969	Sukhari Oraon	Bharatiya Jana Sangh
1972	Umrao Sadho Kujur	Indian National Congress
1977	Sukhari Oraon	Janata Party
1980	Umrao Sadho Kujur	Indian National Congress
1985	Gomeshri Manki	Indian National Congress
1990	Duti Pahan	Bharatiya Janata Party
1995	Duti Pahan	Bharatiya Janata Party
2000	Sawna Lakra	Indian National Congress
Jharkhand Legislative Assembly
2005	Kariya Munda	Bharatiya Janata Party
2009	Sawna Lakra	Indian National Congress
2014	Ram Kumar Pahan	Bharatiya Janata Party
2019	Rajesh Kachhap	Indian National Congress
2024	Rajesh Kachhap	Indian National Congress

== Election results ==
=== Assembly election 2024 ===
2024 Jharkhand Legislative Assembly election: Khijri
Party	Candidate	Votes	%	±%
INC	Rajesh Kachhap	124,049	47.11%	▲8.17
BJP	Ram Kumar Pahan	94,984	36.07%	▼0.33
JLKM	Samundar Pahan	27,030	10.26%	New
Independent	Bipin Toppo	1,993	0.76%	New
BAP	Ajay Kachhap	1,805	0.69%	New
Independent	Birish Minz	1,684	0.64%	New
Independent	Manoj Toppo	1,583	0.60%	New
NOTA	None of the Above	864	0.33%	▼0.87
Margin of victory		29,065	11.04%	▲8.50
Turnout		2,63,332	70.23%	▲6.21
Registered electors		3,74,945		▲11.52
INC hold		Swing	▲8.17	

=== Assembly election 2019 ===
2019 Jharkhand Legislative Assembly election: Khijri
Party	Candidate	Votes	%	±%
INC	Rajesh Kachhap	83,829	38.94%	▲22.48
BJP	Ram Kumar Pahan	78,360	36.40%	▼16.07
AJSU	Ramdhan Bediya	29,091	13.51%	New
JVM(P)	Antu Tirkey	6,732	3.13%	New
Independent	Sarita Tirkey	4,324	2.01%	New
CPI(M)	Prafulla Linda	2,269	1.05%	▼0.46
Jharkhand Party	Sunil Wilson Kerketta	1,767	0.82%	New
NOTA	None of the Above	2,571	1.19%	▲0.36
Margin of victory		5,469	2.54%	▼33.47
Turnout		2,15,267	64.03%	▲3.40
Registered electors		3,36,222		▲13.08
INC gain from BJP		Swing	▼13.53	

=== Assembly election 2014 ===
2014 Jharkhand Legislative Assembly election: Khijri
Party	Candidate	Votes	%	±%
BJP	Ram Kumar Pahan	94,581	52.47%	▲25.70
INC	Sundri Devi	29,669	16.46%	▼12.25
JMM	Antu Tirkey	22,661	12.57%	New
AITC	Prakash Lakra	5,515	3.06%	New
SP	Jitnath Bedia	3,312	1.84%	New
JBSP	Ram Bando	2,850	1.58%	New
CPI(M)	Shankar Lohra	2,735	1.52%	New
NOTA	None of the Above	1,500	0.83%	New
Margin of victory		64,912	36.01%	▲34.07
Turnout		1,80,268	60.63%	▲8.41
Registered electors		2,97,332		▲8.26
BJP gain from INC		Swing	▲23.76	

=== Assembly election 2009 ===
2009 Jharkhand Legislative Assembly election: Khijri
Party	Candidate	Votes	%	±%
INC	Sawna Lakra	41,172	28.71%	▼18.45
BJP	Ram Kumar Pahan	38,394	26.77%	▼23.24
Jharkhand Party	Amulya Niraj Khalkho	15,387	10.73%	New
AJSU	Paras Nath Oraon	13,673	9.53%	▲1.96
UGDP	Belas Tirkey	7,147	4.98%	▼18.17
Lok Jan Vikas Morcha	Pushpa Devi	4,190	2.92%	New
RJD	Sundari Devi	3,313	2.31%	▼5.08
Margin of victory		2,778	1.94%	▼0.91
Turnout		1,43,421	52.22%	▼4.52
Registered electors		2,74,642		▲69.02
INC gain from BJP		Swing	▼21.30	

=== Assembly election 2005 ===
2005 Jharkhand Legislative Assembly election: Khijri
Party	Candidate	Votes	%	±%
BJP	Kariya Munda	46,101	50.01%	▲14.51
INC	Sawna Lakra	43,473	47.16%	▲1.08
UGDP	Amulya Niraj Khalkho	21,345	23.15%	New
AJSU	Rajendra Prasad Shahi Munda	6,984	7.58%	New
RJD	Sundari Devi	6,813	7.39%	▼0.53
Independent	Duti Pahan	3,448	3.74%	New
Independent	Pushpa Devi	3,040	3.30%	New
Margin of victory		2,628	2.85%	▼7.73
Turnout		92,190	56.74%	▲0.13
Registered electors		1,62,489		▼14.44
BJP gain from INC		Swing	▲3.93	

=== Assembly election 2000 ===
2000 Bihar Legislative Assembly election: Khijri
Party	Candidate	Votes	%	±%
INC	Sawna Lakra	49,539	46.08%	New
BJP	Karma Oraon	38,162	35.50%	New
RJD	Sundari Devi	8,516	7.92%	New
JMM	Sunil Fakira Kachhap	4,583	4.26%	New
Independent	Rajendra Prasad Shahi Munda	1,690	1.57%	New
Independent	Birsa Hembram	1,500	1.40%	New
Independent	Bishnu Munda	1,190	1.11%	New
Margin of victory		11,377	10.58%	
Turnout		1,07,510	57.57%	
Registered electors		1,89,915		
INC win (new seat)				

== See also ==
- List of constituencies of the Jharkhand Legislative Assembly
- Ranchi district
