= Simon Tigga =

Indian politician (1929–2004)

Member of Parliament, Lok Sabha
- In office 1984–1989
- Preceded by: Niral Enem Horo
- Succeeded by: Kariya Munda
- Constituency: Khunti, Bihar

Personal details
- Born: 16 March 1929 Sogra, Sinidega, Gumla District, Bihar, British India (present day Jharkhand, India)
- Died: 2004 (aged 75)
- Party: Indian National Congress
- Other political affiliations: Jharkhand Party

Simon Tigga (16 March 1929 – 2004) was an Indian politician. He was elected to the Lok Sabha, the lower house of the Parliament of India from Khunti, Bihar as a member of the Indian National Congress. Tigga died in 2004, at the age of 75.
