= 1977 elections in India =

Elections in India
- 1977

Elections in India in 1977 included Legislative Assembly (Vidhan Sabha) elections in several Indian states, including Goa, Himachal Pradesh, Jammu and Kashmir, Tamil Nadu, and West Bengal.

== Parliamentary Election Result 1977 ==
Party	Votes	%	Seats	+/–
Janata Party	78,062,828	41.32	295	+209
Indian National Congress (R)	65,211,589	34.52	154	–198
Communist Party of India (Marxist)	8,113,659	4.29	22	–3
All India Anna Dravida Munnetra Kazhagam	5,480,378	2.90	18	New
Communist Party of India	5,322,088	2.82	7	–16
Dravida Munnetra Kazhagam	3,323,320	1.76	2	–21
Indian National Congress (Organisation)	3,252,217	1.72	3	–13
Shiromani Akali Dal	2,373,331	1.26	9	+8
Peasants and Workers Party of India	1,030,232	0.55	5	+5
Republican Party of India (Khobragade)	956,072	0.51	2	+2
Revolutionary Socialist Party	851,164	0.45	4	+1
All India Forward Bloc	633,644	0.34	3	+1
Indian Union Muslim League	565,007	0.30	2	0
Kerala Congress (Pillai Group)	526,937	0.28	0	New
Kerala Congress	491,674	0.26	2	–1
Jammu & Kashmir National Conference	483,192	0.26	2	New
Muslim League (Opposition)	318,979	0.17	0	New
Socialist Unity Centre of India	280,995	0.15	0	0
Vishal Haryana Party	192,867	0.10	0	–1
Republican Party of India	155,972	0.08	0	–1
All India Jharkhand Party	126,288	0.07	1	0
United Democratic Front	124,627	0.07	1	New
Maharashtrawadi Gomantak Party	118,748	0.06	1	+1
Jharkhand Party	116,961	0.06	0	New
Manipur Peoples Party	109,130	0.06	0	0
Shoshit Samaj Dal (Akhil Baharatiya)	96,753	0.05	0	New
Revolutionary Communist Party of India	45,047	0.02	0	0
Tripura Upajati Juba Samiti	35,916	0.02	0	New
Hindu Mahasabha	35,419	0.02	0	0
Bihar Prant Hul Jharkhand	27,116	0.01	0	0
Akhil Bharatiya Ram Rajya Parishad	26,169	0.01	0	0
All India Labour Party	17,191	0.01	0	New
Akhil Bharatiya Gorkha League	12,509	0.01	0	0
All India Shiromani Baba Jivan Singh Mazabhi Dal	5,868	0.00	0	New
Independents	10,393,617	5.50	9	–5
Appointed Anglo-Indians			2	0
Total	188,917,504	100.00	544	+23
Valid votes	188,917,504	97.25		
Invalid/blank votes	5,346,411	2.75		
Total votes	194,263,915	100.00		
Registered voters/turnout	321,174,327	60.49		
Source: ECI

== Results ==
Date(s)	State	Government before election	Chief Minister before election	Government after election	Chief Minister after election	Maps
19 March 1977	Kerala	Indian National Congress	C. Achutha Menon	Indian National Congress	K. Karunakaran	
19 March 1977	Kerala	Communist Party of India	C. Achutha Menon	Communist Party of India	K. Karunakaran	
10 June 1977	Tamil Nadu	President's Rule		All India Anna Dravida Munnetra Kazhagam	M. G. Ramachandran	
10 June 1977	Rajasthan	President's Rule		Janata Party	Bhairon Singh Shekhawat	
10 June 1977	Uttar Pradesh	President's Rule		Janata Party	Ram Naresh Yadav	
10 June 1977	Punjab	President's Rule		Shiromani Akali Dal	Parkash Singh Badal	
10 June 1977	Odisha	President's Rule		Janata Party	Nilamani Routray	
10 June 1977	Himachal Pradesh	President's Rule		Janata Party	Shanta Kumar	
10 June 1977	Bihar	President's Rule		Janata Party	Karpoori Thakur	
14 June 1977	West Bengal	Indian National Congress	Siddhartha Shankar Ray	Communist Party of India (Marxist)	Jyoti Basu	
	Goa, Daman and Diu	Maharashtrawadi Gomantak Party	Shashikala Kakodkar	Maharashtrawadi Gomantak Party	Shashikala Kakodkar	
9 July 1977	Jammu and Kashmir	Jammu and Kashmir National Conference	Sheik Abdullah	Jammu and Kashmir National Conference	Sheik Abdullah	
6 October 1977	Haryana	Janata Party	Devi Lal	Janata Party	Devi Lal	
6 October 1977	Madhya Pradesh	President's Rule		Janata Party	Kailash Chandra Joshi	
18 November 1977	Nagaland	President's Rule		United Democratic Front (Nagaland)	Vizol Koso	
31 December 1977	Tripura	President's Rule		Communist Party of India (Marxist)	Nripen Chakraborty	

== Legislative Assembly elections ==
=== Bihar ===
Party	Seats contested	Seats won	Seats Change	Vote Share
Janata Party	311	214	▲214	42.7%
Indian National Congress	286	57	▼110	23.6%
Independent politician	2206	24	▲7	23.7%
Communist Party of India	73	21	▼14	7.0%
Communist Party of India	16	4	▼14	0.9%
Jharkhand Party	31	2	▲1	0.4%
Akhil Bharatiya Shoshit Samaj Dal	26	1	New	0.8%
All India Jharkhand Party	21	1	New	0.5%

=== Goa, Daman and Diu ===
Summary of results of the Goa Legislative Assembly election, 1977
Political Party	Seats contested	Seats won	Number of Votes	% of Votes	Seat change
Maharashtrawadi Gomantak Party	29	15	116,339	38.49%	▼3
Indian National Congress	27	10	87,461	28.94%	▲9
Janata Party	30	3	69,823	23.10%	▲3
Independents	57	2	28,022	9.27%	▲1
Total	145	30	302,237		

=== Haryana ===
Party	Votes	%	Seats
Janata Party	1,765,566	46.70	75
Indian National Congress	648,422	17.15	3
Vishal Haryana Party	225,478	5.96	5
Communist Party of India	29,196	0.77	0
Communist Party of India (Marxist)	23,191	0.61	0
Socialist Unity Center of India	2,916	0.08	0
Republican Party of India	2,058	0.05	0
Republican Party of India (Khobragade)	1,150	0.03	0
Independents	1,082,982	28.64	7
Total	3,780,959	100.00	90
Valid votes	3,780,959	98.77	
Invalid/blank votes	47,101	1.23	
Total votes	3,828,060	100.00	
Registered voters/turnout	5,938,821	64.46	
Source: ECI:

=== Himachal Pradesh ===
Rank	Party	Seats Contested	Seats won	% votes
1	Janata Party	68	53	49.01
2	Indian National Congress	56	9	27.32
3	Independent	68	6	21.10
	Total		68	

=== Jammu and Kashmir ===
Elections for the Indian state of Jammu and Kashmir were held in June 1977, which are generally regarded as the first 'free and fair' elections in the state. Jammu & Kashmir National Conference, newly revived from the former Plebiscite Front, won an overwhelming majority and re-elected Sheikh Abdullah as the Chief Minister.

Party	Votes	%	Seats	+/–
Jammu & Kashmir National Conference	807,166	46.22	47	0
Janata Party	414,259	23.72	13	New
Indian National Congress (R)	294,911	16.89	11	▼47
Jamaat-e-Islami Kashmir	62,654	3.59	1	▼4
Others	1,903	0.11	0	0
Independents	165,477	9.48	4	▲1
Total	1,746,370	100.00	76	▲1
Valid votes	1,746,370	96.80		
Invalid/blank votes	57,734	3.20		
Total votes	1,804,104	100.00		
Registered voters/turnout	2,684,992	67.19		
Source: ECI

=== Kerala ===
Party Wise Results
Party	Seats	Alliance
Indian National Congress (INC)	38	United Front
Communist Party of India (CPI)	23	United Front
Kerala Congress (KEC)	20	United Front
Indian Union Muslim League (IUML)	13	United Front
Revolutionary Socialist Party (RSP)	9	United Front
Communist Party of India (Marxist) (CPM)	17	Opposition
Bhartiya Lok Dal (BLD)	6	Opposition
All India Muslim League (Opposition) (AIML)	3	Opposition
Kerala Congress (Pillai Group) (KCP)	2	Opposition
Independent (IND)	9	
Total	140	

=== Madhya Pradesh ===
SN	Party	Seats Contested	Seats won	Seats Changed	% Votes
1	Janata Party	319	230	N/A	47.28%
2	Indian National Congress (I)	320	84	-136	35.88%
3	Akhil Bharatiya Ram Rajya Parishad	4	1	N/A	2.88%
4	Independent	320	5	-13	15.35%
	Total		320		

=== Nagaland ===
Party	Votes	%	Seats	+/–
United Democratic Front	127,445	39.21	35	+10
Indian National Congress	65,616	20.19	15	New
National Convention of Nagaland	38,528	11.85	1	New
Independents	93,405	28.74	9	–3
Total	324,994	100.00	60	0
Valid votes	324,994	98.07		
Invalid/blank votes	6,407	1.93		
Total votes	331,401	100.00		
Registered voters/turnout	403,454	82.14		
Source: ECI

=== Odisha ===
Party	No. of candidates	No. of elected	No. of votes	%
Janata Party	147	110	2527787	49.2%
Indian National Congress	146	26	1594505	31.0%
Independents	264	9	738545	14.4%
Communist Party of India	25	1	183485	3.6%
Communist Party of India (Marxist)	4	1	45219	0.9%
All India Jharkhand Party	10	0	25002	0.5%
Socialist Unity Centre of India	6	0	18773	0.4%
Jharkhand Party	2	0	7233	0.1%

=== Punjab ===
Party	contested	Seats won	change in seats	popular vote	%
Shiromani Akali Dal	70	58	▲34	17,76,602	31.41%
Janata Party	41	25	(new)	8,47,718	14.99%
Indian National Congress	96	17	▼49	18,99,534	33.59%
Communist Party of India (Marxist)	8	8	▲7	1,98,144	3.50%
Communist Party of India	18	7	▼3	3,72,711	6.59%
Independents	435	2	▼1	5,41,958	9.58%
Others	14	0	-	18,686	0.33%
Total	682	117		56,55,353	

=== Rajasthan ===
Party	Votes	%	Seats	+/–
Janata Party	4,160,373	50.39	152	New
Indian National Congress	2,599,772	31.49	41	–104
Communist Party of India	91,640	1.11	1	–3
Communist Party of India (Marxist)	61,682	0.75	1	+1
Indian Union Muslim League	21,889	0.27	0	New
Vishal Haryana Party	1,290	0.02	0	New
Akhil Bharatiya Ram Rajya Parishad	320	0.00	0	New
Independents	1,319,053	15.98	5	–6
Total	8,256,019	100.00	200	+16
Valid votes	8,256,019	97.89		
Invalid/blank votes	177,653	2.11		
Total votes	8,433,672	100.00		
Registered voters/turnout	15,494,289	54.43		
Source: ECI

=== Tamil Nadu ===
The sixth legislative assembly election of Tamil Nadu was held on June 10, 1977. All India Anna Dravida Munnetra Kazhagam (AIADMK) won the election defeating its rival Dravida Munnetra Kazhagam (DMK). M. G. Ramachandran (M.G.R), the AIADMK founder and a leading Tamil film actor, was sworn in as Chief Minister for the first time. The election was a four cornered contest between the AIADMK, DMK, the Indian National Congress (INC) and the Janata Party. Earlier on 17 October 1972, M.G.R had founded the AIADMK following his expulsion from the DMK after differences arose between him and DMK leader M. Karunanidhi. On 31 January 1976, Karunanidhi's government was dismissed by the central government of Prime Minister Indira Gandhi citing corruption charges against Karunanidhi and President's rule was imposed on the state. Karunanidhi had been at odds with Indira Gandhi over his opposition to Emergency and allied with Janata Party founded by Jayaprakash Narayan. Meanwhile, M.G.R had developed a close relationship with Indira Gandhi and supported the Emergency. M.G.R remained as Chief Minister until his death in 1987, winning the next two elections held in 1980 and 1984.

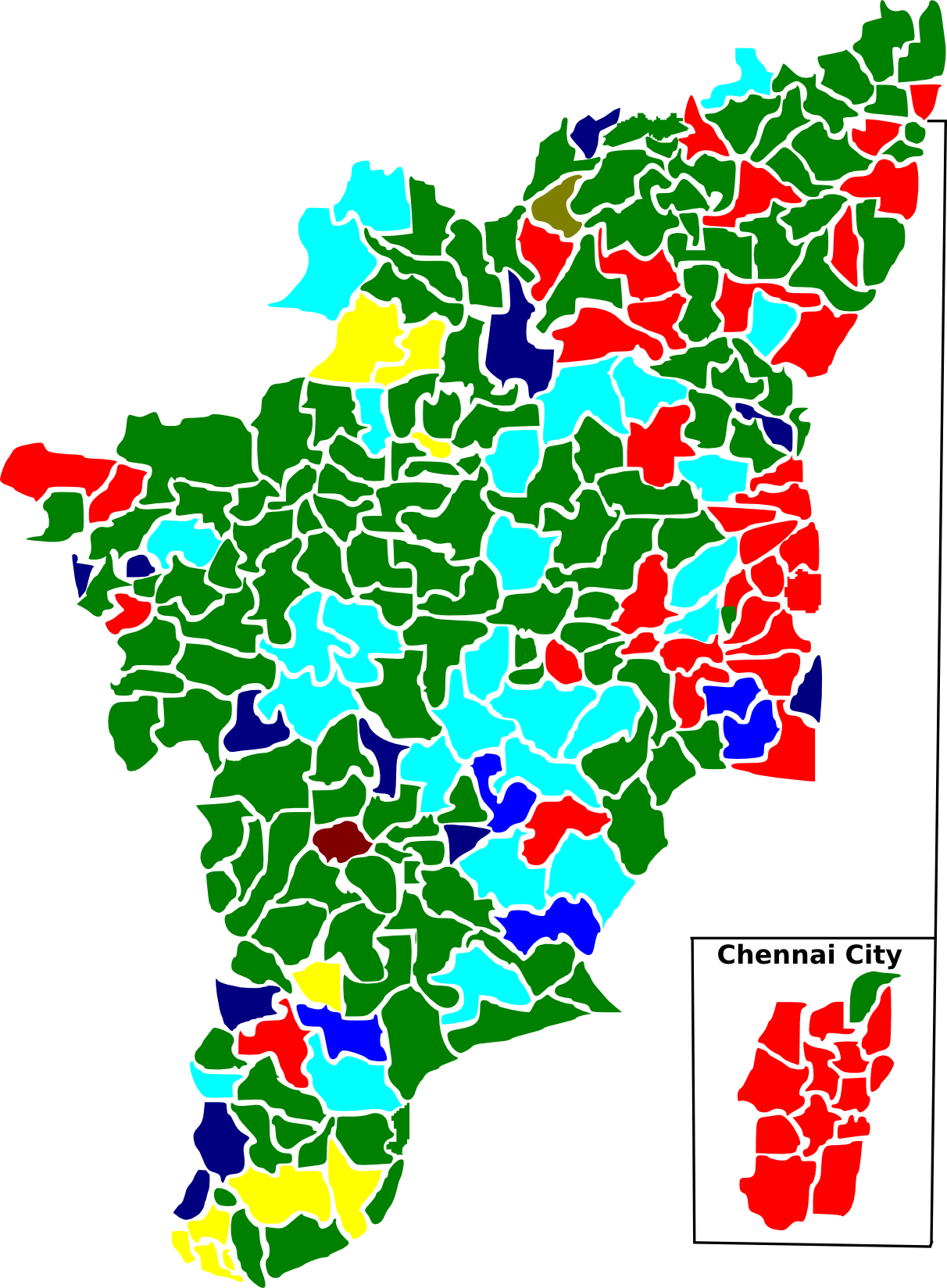
Election map of results based on parties. Colours are based on the results table on the left

Summary of the 1977 June Tamil Nadu Legislative Assembly election results
Alliance/Party	Seats won	Change	Popular Vote	Vote %	Adj. %^{‡}
AIADMK+ alliance	144	+142	5,734,692	33.5%	
AIADMK	130	+130	5,194,876	30.4%	35.4%
CPI(M)	12	+12	477,835	2.8%	33.0%
FBL	1	–	35,361	0.2%	62.0%
IND	1	–	26,620	0.2%	42.9%
DMK	48	-136	4,258,771	24.9%	
DMK	48	-136	4,258,771	24.9%	25.3%
Congress alliance	32	+24	3,491,490	20.4%	
INC	27	+27	2,994,535	17.5%	20.8%
CPI	5	-3	496,955	2.9%	20.4%
Janata	10	+10	2,851,884	16.7%	
JNP	10	+10	2,851,884	16.7%	16.8%
Others	1	-7	751,712	4.4%	
IND	1	-7	751,712	4.4%	–
Total	234	–	17,108,146	100%	–

‡: Vote % reflects the percentage of votes the party received compared to the entire electorate that voted in this election. Adjusted (Adj.) Vote %, reflects the % of votes the party received per constituency that they contested.
Sources: Election Commission of India

=== Tripura ===
Performance of the political parties in this election
Party	Seats contested	Seats won	No. of votes	% of votes	1972 Seats
Communist Party of India	10	0	6,266	0.84%	1
Communist Party of India (Marxist)	55	51	352,652	47.00%	16
Indian National Congress	60	0	133,240	17.76%	41
Janata Party	59	0	78,479	10.46%	-
All India Forward Bloc	1	1	7,800	1.04%	0
Revolutionary Socialist Party	2	2	12,446	1.66%	-
Proutist Bloc of India	6	0	2,139	0.29%	-
Congress for Democracy	59	0	66,913	9.08%	-
Tripura Upajati Juba Samiti	28	4	59,474	7.93%	0
Independents	48	2	30,862	4.11%	2
Total	328	60	750,271		

=== Uttar Pradesh ===
Party	Votes	%	Seats	+/–
Janata Party	11,351,359	47.76	352	New
Indian National Congress	7,592,107	31.94	47	–168
Communist Party of India	611,450	2.57	9	–7
Communist Party of India (Marxist)	136,850	0.58	1	–1
Others	241,821	1.02	0	0
Independents	3,832,832	16.13	16	+12
Total	23,766,419	100.00	425	+1
Valid votes	23,766,419	98.40		
Invalid/blank votes	386,237	1.60		
Total votes	24,152,656	100.00		
Registered voters/turnout	52,345,606	46.14		
Source: ECI

=== West Bengal ===
Legislative Assembly elections were held in the Indian state of West Bengal on 14 June 1977. The polls took place after the ousting of Indira Gandhi's government at the Centre. The Left Front won a landslide victory, much to the surprise of the left parties themselves. The 1977 election marked the beginning of the 34-year Left Front rule in West Bengal, with Communist Party of India (Marxist) leader Jyoti Basu leading the first Left Front cabinet.

Party		Candidates	Seats	Votes	%
Left Front	Communist Party of India (Marxist)	224	178	5,080,828	35.46
Left Front	All India Forward Bloc	36	25	750,229	5.24
Left Front	Revolutionary Socialist Party	23	20	536,625	3.74
Left Front	Revolutionary Communist Party of India	4	3	75,156	0.52
Left Front	Marxist Forward Bloc	3	3	58,466	0.41
Left Front	Biplobi Bangla Congress	2	1	35,457	0.25
Left Front	LF independent	1	1	32,238	0.22
Janata Party		289	29	2,869,391	20.02
Indian National Congress (R)		290	20	3,298,063	23.02
Communist Party of India		63	2	375,560	2.62
Socialist Unity Centre of India		29	4	211,752	1.48
Indian Union Muslim League		32	1	54,942	0.38
Workers Party of India		2	1	29,221	0.20
Jharkhand Party		2	0	5,701	0.04
Republican Party of India		3	0	1,652	0.01
All India Gorkha League		2	0	810	0.01
Bharater Biplobi Communist Party		1	0	489	0.00
Independents		566	7	912,612	6.37
Total		1,572	294	14,329,201	100
Source: ECI

== Sources ==
- Guha, Ramachandra (2008), India after Gandhi: The History of the World's Largest Democracy, Pan Macmillan, ISBN 978-0330396110
