= Torpa Assembly constituency =

Assembly constituency in Jharkhand

Coordinates: 22.94°N 85.09°E

Torpa
- Constituency No. 59 for the Jharkhand Legislative Assembly

Constituency details
- Country: India
- Region: East India
- State: Jharkhand
- District: Khunti
- Lok Sabha constituency: Khunti
- Established: 2000
- Total electors: 181,744
- Reservation: ST

Member of Legislative Assembly
- 6th Jharkhand Legislative Assembly
- Incumbent Sudeep Gudhiya
- Party: JMM
- Alliance: MGB
- Elected year: 2024

Torpa Assembly constituency is an assembly constituency in the Indian state of Jharkhand. Paulus Surin of JMM defeated Koche Munda of BJP by just 43 votes in the 2014 Assembly Election.

Most successful parties after separate Jharkhand state.
1. JMM (60.0%)
2. BJP (40.0%)

== Members of Legislative Assembly ==
Election	Member	Party
Bihar Legislative Assembly
Before 1957: Constituency did not exist
1957	Julius Munda	Jharkhand Party
1962	Samuel Munda	Janata Party
1967	S. Pahan	Indian National Congress
1969	Niral Enem Horo	Independent politician
1972-77: Constituency did not exist
1977	Niral Enem Horo	Jan Kranti Dal
1980	Leyandar Tiru	Indian National Congress
1985	Niral Enem Horo	Independent politician
1990	Niral Enem Horo	Jharkhand Party
1995	Niral Enem Horo	All India Jharkhand Party
2000	Koche Munda	Bharatiya Janata Party
Jharkhand Legislative Assembly
2005	Koche Munda	Bharatiya Janata Party
2009	Paulus Surin	Jharkhand Mukti Morcha
2014	Paulus Surin	Jharkhand Mukti Morcha
2019	Koche Munda	Bharatiya Janata Party
2024	Sudeep Gudhiya	Jharkhand Mukti Morcha

== Election results ==
=== Assembly election 2024 ===
2024 Jharkhand Legislative Assembly election: Torpa
Party	Candidate	Votes	%	±%
JMM	Sudeep Gudhiya	80,887	59.76	▲30.82
BJP	Koche Munda	40,240	29.73	▼7.44
JLKM	Wilson Bhengra	2,832	2.09	New
Independent	Brajendra Hemrom	2,356	1.74	New
BSP	Savitri Devi	1,278	0.94	New
Jharkhand Party	Kulan Patras Aind	1,202	0.89	▼4.40
Independent	Anita Surin	940	0.69	New
NOTA	None of the Above	3,046	2.25	▼0.09
Margin of victory		40,647	30.03	▲21.80
Turnout		1,35,354	67.92	▲3.55
Registered electors		1,99,272		▲9.64
JMM gain from BJP		Swing	▲22.59	

=== Assembly election 2019 ===
2019 Jharkhand Legislative Assembly election: Torpa
Party	Candidate	Votes	%	±%
BJP	Koche Munda	43,482	37.17	▲6.44
JMM	Sudeep Guria	33,852	28.94	▼1.83
Independent	Paulus Surin	19,234	16.44	New
Jharkhand Party	Subhas Kongari	6,190	5.29	▼12.94
JVM(P)	Ishwardutt Marshal Mundu	4,910	4.20	New
JD(U)	Sudhir Dang	3,560	3.04	New
Independent	Sahdev Chik Badaik	1,907	1.63	New
NOTA	None of the Above	2,737	2.34	▼1.34
Margin of victory		9,630	8.23	▲8.19
Turnout		1,16,993	64.37	▲3.30
Registered electors		1,81,744		▲6.70
BJP gain from JMM		Swing	▲6.40	

=== Assembly election 2014 ===
2014 Jharkhand Legislative Assembly election: Torpa
Party	Candidate	Votes	%	±%
JMM	Paulus Surin	32,003	30.76	▼10.02
BJP	Koche Munda	31,960	30.72	▲8.59
Jharkhand Party	Suman Bhengra	18,966	18.23	▲15.37
INC	Puneet Hemrom	8,242	7.92	New
ABJP	Samrom Topno	3,191	3.07	New
AITC	Clementia Hemrom	2,324	2.23	New
Independent	Vijay Aind	1,959	1.88	New
NOTA	None of the Above	3,828	3.68	New
Margin of victory		43	0.04	▼18.61
Turnout		1,04,031	61.08	▲1.39
Registered electors		1,70,330		▲19.99
JMM hold		Swing	▼10.02	

=== Assembly election 2009 ===
2009 Jharkhand Legislative Assembly election: Torpa
Party	Candidate	Votes	%	±%
JMM	Paulus Surin	34,551	40.78	▲27.05
BJP	Koche Munda	18,752	22.13	▼13.07
JVM(P)	Vijay Mundu	16,779	19.81	New
Independent	Monren Topno	3,899	4.60	New
Independent	Stanislas Kindo	2,911	3.44	New
Jharkhand Party	Kulan Patras Aind	2,420	2.86	▼22.47
Independent	Shanti Hemrom	1,355	1.60	New
Margin of victory		15,799	18.65	▲8.76
Turnout		84,721	59.68	▲0.23
Registered electors		1,41,953		▲2.57
JMM gain from BJP		Swing	▲5.58	

=== Assembly election 2005 ===
2005 Jharkhand Legislative Assembly election: Torpa
Party	Candidate	Votes	%	±%
BJP	Koche Munda	28,965	35.21	▼2.02
Jharkhand Party	Niral Enem Horo	20,833	25.32	New
JMM	Peter Bage	11,300	13.73	New
Independent	Vijay Mundu	9,078	11.03	New
Independent	Rajni Kandulna	4,239	5.15	New
Independent	Nirmal Hemrom	2,858	3.47	New
RJD	Vayalet Kachchhap	1,876	2.28	▼1.96
Margin of victory		8,132	9.88	▲5.27
Turnout		82,273	59.45	▲4.82
Registered electors		1,38,394		▲12.65
BJP hold		Swing	▼2.02	

=== Assembly election 2000 ===
2000 Bihar Legislative Assembly election: Torpa
Party	Candidate	Votes	%	±%
BJP	Koche Munda	24,986	37.23	New
Independent	Niral Enem Horo	21,889	32.62	New
INC	Dolly Kandulna	13,674	20.37	New
NCP	S. Topno	3,546	5.28	New
RJD	David Manjar	2,847	4.24	New
Margin of victory		3,097	4.61	
Turnout		67,113	55.74	
Registered electors		1,22,854		
BJP win (new seat)				

== See also ==
- Vidhan Sabha
- List of states of India by type of legislature
