= 1974 Indian vice presidential election =

Vice-presidential election in India

← 1969	27 August 1974	1979 →
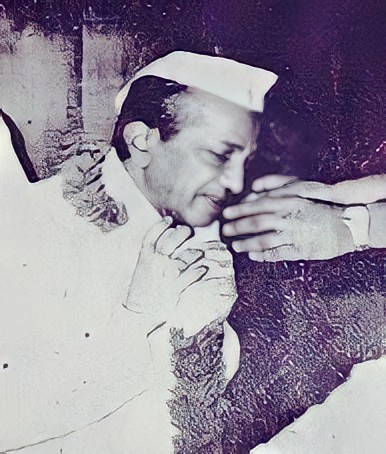

Nominee	Basappa Danappa Jatti	Niral Enem Horo
Party	INC(R)	Jharkhand Party
Home state	Karnataka	Bihar
Electoral vote	521	141
Percentage	78.70%	21.30%
Vice President before election
Gopal Swarup Pathak
Independent
Elected Vice President
Basappa Danappa Jatti
INC(R)

The 1974 Indian vice presidential election was held on 27 August 1974. B. D. Jatti defeated his opponent, Niral Enem Horo to become the fifth vice president of India.

There were some changes in the law regarding vice-presidential elections, as follows:

- The nomination paper of a vice-presidential candidate shall be subscribed by at least 5 electors as proposers and 5 electors as seconders.
- The security deposit was changed to Rs. 2,500.
- An election petition challenging an election can be presented only before the Supreme Court by any candidate or at least 10 electors joined as petitioners.
- The time table for the elections to the offices of the President and Vice-President was made statutory. It was provided that the last date for making nominations shall be the 14th day after the publication of the notification calling the election, the scrutiny will be on the day following such last date for filing nominations, the last date for withdrawal of candidatures will be the second day following the date of scrutiny and the date of poll, if necessary, shall be not earlier than the fifteenth day after the last date for withdrawal of candidatures.

== Result ==
Result of the Indian vice-presidential election, 1974
Candidate	Party	Electoral Votes	% of Votes
B. D. Jatti	INC(R)	521	78.70
Niral Enem Horo	Jharkhand Party	141	21.30
Total		662	100.00
Valid Votes		662	98.51
Invalid Votes		10	1.49
Turnout		672	87.61
Abstentions		95	12.39
Electors		767	

== See also ==
- 1974 Indian presidential election
