= United Jharkhand Party =

United Jharkhand Party, a political party in India. Founded in 1948 by Justin Richard. Jaipal Singh, a leader of the Adivasi Mahasabha, joined the party. Later Singh would launch the Jharkhand Party.

Another party with the same name appeared in Indian politics in 1991.
