= Kariya Munda =

Indian politician

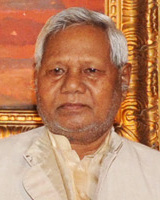

Deputy Speaker of the Lok Sabha
- In office 8 June 2009 – 18 May 2014
- Speaker: Meira Kumar
- Preceded by: Charanjit Singh Atwal
- Succeeded by: M. Thambidurai

Union Minister of Non-Conventional Energy Sources
- In office 9 January 2004 – 22 May 2004
- Prime Minister: Atal Bihari Vajpayee
- Preceded by: Atal Bihari Vajpayee
- Succeeded by: Vilas Muttemwar

Union Minister of Coal
- In office 29 January 2003 – 9 January 2004
- Prime Minister: Atal Bihari Vajpayee
- Preceded by: Uma Bharti
- Succeeded by: Mamata Banerjee

Union Minister of Agro and Rural Industries
- In office 1 September 2001 – 29 January 2004
- Prime Minister: Atal Bihari Vajpayee
- Preceded by: Vasundhara Raje
- Succeeded by: Sangh Priya Gautam

Union Minister of State for Steel and Mines
- In office 14 August 1977 – 28 July 1979
- Prime Minister: Morarji Desai
- Minister: Biju Patnaik

Member of Parliament, Lok Sabha
- In office 16 May 2009 – 23 May 2019
- Preceded by: Sushila Kerketta
- Succeeded by: Arjun Munda
- Constituency: Khunti
- In office 2 December 1989 – 18 May 2004
- Preceded by: Simon Tigga
- Succeeded by: Sushila Kerketta
- Constituency: Khunti
- In office 1977–1980
- Preceded by: Niral Enem Horo
- Succeeded by: Niral Enem Horo
- Constituency: Khunti

Member, Jharkhand Legislative Assembly
- In office 27 February 2005 – 16 May 2009
- Preceded by: Constituency established
- Succeeded by: Sawna Lakra
- Constituency: Khijri

Personal details
- Born: 20 April 1936 (age 90) Anigara, Bihar, (present-day Jharkhand), British India
- Party: Bharatiya Janata Party
- Spouse: Sunanda Devi (m. 1967)
- Children: 2 sons, 3 daughters
- Parents: Hadwa Munda (father); Chambri Devi (mother)
- Education: M.A.
- Alma mater: Ranchi University
- Awards: Padma Bhushan (2019)

Kariya Munda (born 20 April 1936; Hindi pronunciation: [kəɾɪjaː mʊɳɖaː]) is an Indian politician who served as Deputy Speaker of the 15th Lok Sabha. He has been a minister in the Government of India, serving in the governments led by the Janata Party in 1977 and by Bhartiya Janata Party from 1999 onwards.

== Early life ==
Munda was born in Khunti district, near the state capital of Ranchi of Jharkhand state in India. Khunti is among the predominantly tribal belt in the central-eastern part of India. Incidentally, the village 'Ulihatu' near Khunti, is also the birthplace of the legendary, great tribal leader called Birsa Munda. Munda passed his M.A. examination from Ranchi University, in Anthropology, a subject which also predominantly studies the tribals in India and elsewhere.

== Political career ==
=== Lok Sabha elections ===
Munda was 1st elected to the Sixth Lok Sabha in 1977 from Khunti constituency in Bihar state (presently, in Jharkhand state). He was re-elected to the Lok Sabha in 1989, 1991, 1996, 1998, 1999, and 2009 from the same constituency of Khunti. In between, he was also elected and served as MLA to the Legislative Assemblies of Bihar and later, Jharkhand.

He was inducted into the Morarji Desai government in 1977 and given the portfolio of Steel Ministry, in the capacity as the Minister of State. He was a cabinet minister in the ministry headed by Atal Bihari Vajpayee, including the famous stint in the 13 days' government in 1999 and afterward. He has now been among the senior leaders of Bharatiya Janata Party, rising from the days of the 'Jansangh' and have witnessed many ups and downs in Indian politics, particularly since the days of emergency.

He was one of the candidates in the race to become first Chief Minister of Jharkhand at the time of its establishment in November 2000 but lost of Babulal Marandi and became the Minister for Agro and Rural Industries from September 2001 to January 2003 and Minister of Coal and Non-Conventional Energy Sources in Atal Bihari Vajpayee's third cabinet.

In the 2004 Lok Sabha elections, he lost Khunti seat to Sushila Kerketta of Indian National Congress. He won the Khijri Vidhan Sabha seat in 2005 Jharkhand Legislative Assembly election.

During 15th Lok Sabha, Munda was unanimously elected Deputy Speaker of Lok Sabha. He won the Khunti constituency for the 7th time in the 2014 Lok Sabha elections.

=== Pathalgadi movement against tribal land law amendments ===
In 2016–2017, the Raghubar Das ministry was seeking amendments to the Chhotanagpur Tenancy Act, 1908, and the Santhal Pargana Tenancy Act, 1949. These two original laws had safeguarded the rights of the tribal communities on their land. According to the existing laws the land transactions could only be done between the tribals. The new amendments gave the tribals the right to allow the government to make commercial use of the tribal land and to take the tribal land on lease. The proposed bill amending the existing law had been approved by the Jharkhand Legislative Assembly. The bills were sent to Murmu for approval in November 2016.

The tribal people had strongly objected to the proposed law. During the Pathalgardi rebellion, protests were held against the proposed amendments to the tenancy acts. In one incident the protests turned violent and the tribals abducted the security detail of BJP MP Karia Munda. Police responded with violent crackdown on the tribals, that caused the death of a tribal man. Criminal cases were filed against more than 200 people including the tribal rights activist Father Stan Swamy. Murmu, was criticised for her soft stand on police aggression against tribals during the movement. Being a tribal herself, Murmu was expected to speak up to the government in support of the tribals but it did not happen, and instead she appealed to the Pathalgarhi agitation leaders to repose faith in the constitution.

Murmu had received total of 192 memorandums against the amendments in the bill. Then opposition leader Hemant Soren had said that the BJP government wanted to acquire tribal land through the two amendment Bills for the benefit of corporates. Opposition parties Jharkhand Mukti Morcha, the Congress, the Jharkhand Vikas Morcha and others had put intense pressure against the bill. On 24 May 2017, Murmu relented and refused to give assent to the bills and returned the bill to the state government along with the memorandums she had received. The bill was later withdrawn in August 2017.

=== 2019 Lok Sabha elections ===
He was one of the few elderly leaders of Bharatiya Janata Party who was denied a ticket for the 2019 Lok Sabha elections.
