= Veer Birsa Dal =

Veer Birsa Dal (Hindi: वीर बिरसा दल) was an Adivasi political party in Bihar, India. It was one of several splinter groups that appeared 1967–1972, after the Jharkhand Party had merged into the Indian National Congress.
