= Chhotanagpur Front =

Defunct political party of India

- Split from: Jharkhand Party
- Merged into: Indian National Congress
- ECI Status: Registered unrecognized

Chhotanagpur Front was an Adivasi political party in Bihar, India. It was one of several splinter groups that appeared 1967–1972, after the Jharkhand Party had merged into the Indian National Congress.
