= 1977 Rajasthan Legislative Assembly election =

Election in Indian state

- 10 June 1977

All 200 seats in the Rajasthan Legislative Assembly 101 seats needed for a majority
- Registered: 15,494,289
- Turnout: 57.76%
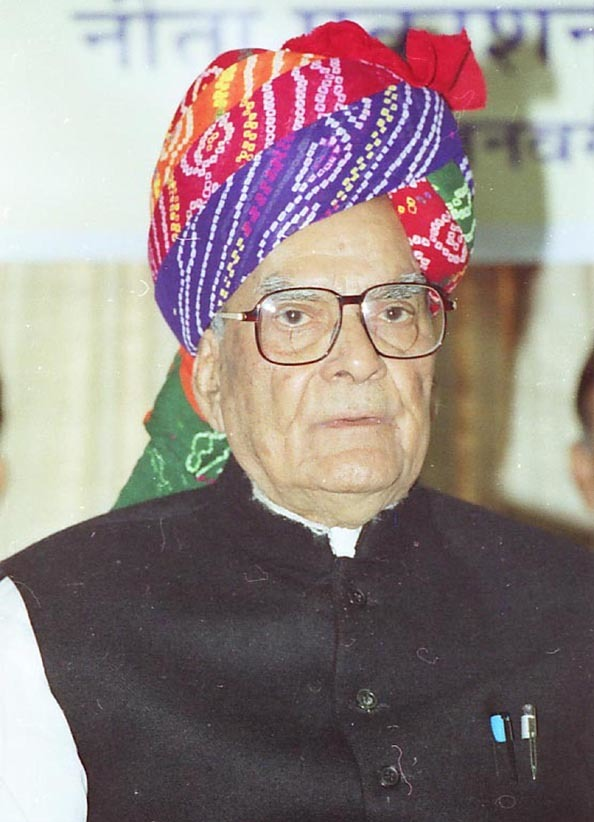

	Majority party	Minority party
Leader	Bhairon Singh Shekhawat
Party	JP	INC
Leader's seat	Chhabra (bypoll)
Seats before	New	145
Seats won	152	41
Seat change	New	▼104
Popular vote	50.39%	31.49%
CM before election
President's Rule
Elected CM
Bhairon Singh Shekhawat
JP

Elections to the Rajasthan Legislative Assembly were held in June 1977, to elect members of the 200 constituencies in Rajasthan, India. The Janata Party won a majority of seats as well as the popular vote, and its leader, Bhairon Singh Shekhawat was appointed as the Chief Minister of Rajasthan.

After the passing of The Delimitation of Parliamentary and Assembly Constituencies Order, 1976, Rajasthan's Legislative Assembly was assigned 200 constituencies.

== Result ==
Party	Votes	%	Seats	+/–
Janata Party	4,160,373	50.39	152	New
Indian National Congress	2,599,772	31.49	41	▼104
Communist Party of India	91,640	1.11	1	▼3
Communist Party of India (Marxist)	61,682	0.75	1	▲1
Indian Union Muslim League	21,889	0.27	0	New
Vishal Haryana Party	1,290	0.02	0	New
Akhil Bharatiya Ram Rajya Parishad	320	0.00	0	New
Independents	1,319,053	15.98	5	▼6
Total	8,256,019	100.00	200	▲16
Valid votes	8,256,019	97.89		
Invalid/blank votes	177,653	2.11		
Total votes	8,433,672	100.00		
Registered voters/turnout	15,494,289	54.43		
Source: ECI

== Elected members ==
Constituency		Winner				Runner Up				Margin	%
No.	Name	Candidate	Party	Votes	%	Candidate	Party	Votes	%	Margin	%
1	Bhadra	Lal Chand	JP	22,705	42.58	Daya Ram	IND	16,969	31.83	5,736	10.75
2	Nohar	Bahadur Singh	JP	19,450	36.10	Hans Raj	INC	13,884	25.77	5,566	10.33
3	Tibi (SC)	Dungar Ram	JP	22,973	48.46	Birbal	INC	19,250	40.60	3,723	7.86
4	Hanumangarh	Shopat Singh Makasar	CPI(M)	14,204	30.88	Bhim Raj	INC	11,586	25.19	2,618	5.69
5	Sangaria	Ram Chander	INC	20,995	38.23	Gurtej Singh	IND	16,162	29.43	4,833	8.80
6	Ganganagar	Kedar Nath	JP	24,810	63.91	Radhey Shyam	INC	12,102	31.18	12,708	32.73
7	Kesrisinghpur (SC)	Manphool Ram	INC	19,124	46.28	Chhotu Ram	JP	14,453	34.98	4,671	11.30
8	Karanpur	Jagtar Singh	INC	24,932	50.54	Gurdial Singh	JP	21,698	43.98	3,234	6.56
9	Raisinghnagar (SC)	Dula Ram	INC	23,682	48.34	Jamna	JP	22,640	46.21	1,042	2.13
10	Pilibanga	Harchand Singh	JP	23,995	48.59	Manphool Singh	INC	22,236	45.03	1,759	3.56
11	Suratgarh	Gurusharan Chabbra	JP	19,956	39.55	Amar Chand Middha	IND	15,791	31.29	4,165	8.26
12	Lunkaransar	Manik Chand Surana	JP	22,656	43.61	Khaturia Kanta	INC	14,509	27.93	8,147	15.68
13	Bikaner	Mehboob Ali	JP	33,064	66.39	Gokul Prasad	INC	14,988	30.10	18,076	36.29
14	Kolayat	Ram Krishan Dass	JP	30,986	63.21	Vijay Singh	INC	9,554	19.49	21,432	43.72
15	Nokha (SC)	Uda Ram Hatila	JP	21,988	69.43	Govind Ram	IND	5,612	17.72	16,376	51.71
16	Dungargarh	Mohan Lal Sharma	JP	24,568	46.34	Megh Raj Sankhla	IND	8,379	15.81	16,189	30.53
17	Sujangarh (SC)	Rawat Ram	JP	28,585	65.36	Bhanwar Lal	INC	13,403	30.65	15,182	34.71
18	Ratangarh	Jagdish Chandra	JP	26,061	63.42	Jaideo Prasad Indoria	INC	11,641	28.33	14,420	35.09
19	Sardarshahar	Hajari Mal	JP	35,605	65.27	Hanuman Mal Radio	INC	17,619	32.30	17,986	32.97
20	Churu	Megh Raj	JP	24,280	54.65	Mohar Singh	INC	15,184	34.17	9,096	20.48
21	Taranagar	Mani Ram	JP	23,460	49.96	Chandan Mal Baid	INC	12,962	27.60	10,498	22.36
22	Sadulpur	Jaya Narain	JP	18,272	39.58	Deep Chand	IND	17,513	37.94	759	1.64
23	Pilani	Sheesh Ram Ola	INC	22,820	43.25	Hazari Lal Sharma	IND	19,640	37.22	3,180	6.03
24	Surajgarh (SC)	Subhash Chand Arya	JP	23,881	53.38	Sundar Lal	INC	18,233	40.76	5,648	12.62
25	Khetri	Mala Ram	JP	16,360	41.40	Prahlad Singh	INC	6,724	17.02	9,636	24.38
26	Gudha	Inder Singh	JP	24,808	49.81	Shiv Nath Singh	INC	20,995	42.15	3,813	7.66
27	Nawalgarh	Navrang Singh	JP	17,420	34.27	Kehswar Dev	IND	15,972	31.42	1,448	2.85
28	Jhunjhunu	Sumitra Singh	INC	25,478	49.85	Sawan Mal Verma	JP	18,629	36.45	6,849	13.40
29	Mandawa	Ram Narain Chaudhari	INC	23,342	46.79	Lachhu Ram	IND	13,766	27.60	9,576	19.19
30	Fatehpur	Alam Ali Khan	JP	21,183	43.94	Sanwar Mal	INC	16,651	34.54	4,532	9.40
31	Lachhmangarh (SC)	Paras Ram	INC	19,002	45.14	Ram Deo	JP	18,808	44.68	194	0.46
32	Sikar	Ranmal Singh	INC	24,626	53.30	Madan Lal	JP	18,605	40.27	6,021	13.03
33	Dhod	Randeo Singh	INC	30,106	55.44	Gordhan Singh	JP	23,355	43.01	6,751	12.43
34	Danta - Ramgarh	Madan Singh	IND	20,686	41.23	Narain Singh	INC	19,462	38.79	1,224	2.44
35	Srimadhopur	Har Lal Singh Kharra	JP	26,937	60.44	Bishan Singh	IND	14,709	33.00	12,228	27.44
36	Khandela	Gopal Singh	JP	30,837	69.86	Jhabar Mal Sunda	INC	9,235	20.92	21,602	48.94
37	Neem-Ka-Thana	Surya Narain	JP	21,633	51.57	Shiv Ram Singh	INC	12,122	28.90	9,511	22.67
38	Chomu	Rameshwar	JP	26,004	63.80	Dinesh Kumar	INC	10,088	24.75	15,916	39.05
39	Amber	Pushpa	JP	12,252	30.62	Gopal Dutta	INC	5,141	12.85	7,111	17.77
40	Jaipur Rural	Ujla Arora	JP	21,704	67.07	Sayad Hussain	INC	6,305	19.48	15,399	47.59
41	Hawamahal	Bhanwar Lal Sharma	JP	31,659	88.37	Rameshwar Maheshwari	INC	3,642	10.17	28,017	78.20
42	Johribazar	Gul Mohammed	JP	26,535	60.57	Mohd. Gaffar Ali	CPI	8,714	19.89	17,821	40.68
43	Kishanpole	Girdhari Lal Bhargava	JP	28,996	69.47	Shriram Gotewala	INC	10,450	25.04	18,546	44.43
44	Bani Park	Bajrang Lal Sharma	JP	17,654	46.33	Mohan Punamiya	CPI(M)	9,053	23.76	8,601	22.57
45	Phulera	Hari Singh	JP	23,907	55.31	Mangi Lal	INC	14,115	32.66	9,792	22.65
46	Dudu (SC)	Sohan Lal	JP	23,560	66.59	Ladu Ram	INC	10,689	30.21	12,871	36.38
47	Sanganer	Vidya Pathak	JP	18,218	43.48	Jain Singh	INC	7,535	17.98	10,683	25.50
48	Phagi (SC)	Shiv Karan	JP	25,274	71.69	Gopi Lal Gothwal	INC	8,975	25.46	16,299	46.23
49	Lalsot (ST)	Har Sahai	JP	20,476	57.22	Kailash	INC	15,307	42.78	5,169	14.44
50	Sikrai (ST)	Ram Kishore Meena	JP	19,178	62.08	Ratan Lal Patel	INC	11,167	36.15	8,011	25.93
51	Bandikui	Vijay Singh Nandera	JP	21,045	49.52	Bishamber Nath Joshi	INC	11,743	27.63	9,302	21.89
52	Dausa (SC)	Mool Chand Samaria	JP	19,252	55.26	Ram Lal Bansiwal	INC	13,782	39.56	5,470	15.70
53	Bassi	Shiv Raj Singh	JP	17,944	45.57	Jagdish Prasad Tiwari	INC	12,360	31.39	5,584	14.18
54	Jamwa Ramgarh	Rameshawar	JP	15,359	41.28	Rewadmal Patel	INC	10,936	29.39	4,423	11.89
55	Bairath	Gunwant Kumari	JP	21,595	45.94	Ghisa Lal Sepat	IND	9,381	19.96	12,214	25.98
56	Kotputli	Ram Karan	IND	9,628	19.54	Ramjit Lal	IND	7,989	16.21	1,639	3.33
57	Bansur	Hari Singh Yadav	JP	19,986	44.26	Ram Kanwar	IND	7,059	15.63	12,927	28.63
58	Behror	Bhawani Singh	JP	25,487	60.85	Ram Dhan	INC	11,262	26.89	14,225	33.96
59	Mandawar	Hira Lal	JP	18,754	48.49	Ghasi Ram	INC	16,027	41.44	2,727	7.05
60	Tizara	Ayub	JP	15,185	37.96	Ram Singh Yadav	INC	11,537	28.84	3,648	9.12
61	Khairthal (SC)	Sampat Ram	JP	16,479	49.92	Gokal Chand	INC	9,100	27.57	7,379	22.35
62	Ramgarh	Jai Krishan	INC	11,898	28.03	Hari Shankar Goyal	JP	9,553	22.51	2,345	5.52
63	Alwar	Jeet Mal	JP	21,613	55.60	Ishwar Lal	INC	16,176	41.61	5,437	13.99
64	Thanagazi	Shiv Narain	JP	14,479	39.38	Sita Ram	INC	6,579	17.89	7,900	21.49
65	Rajgarh (ST)	Samarth Lal	IND	17,545	40.09	Laxminarayan	JP	12,199	27.87	5,346	12.22
66	Lachhmangarh	Ch. Nathi Singh	JP	15,928	34.22	Bihari Lal	INC	10,257	22.04	5,671	12.18
67	Kathumar (SC)	Ganga Sahai	JP	20,826	57.38	Babu Lalbairwa	INC	12,284	33.84	8,542	23.54
68	Kaman	Mohammed Jahoor	JP	11,234	29.63	Manohar Lal	IND	7,356	19.40	3,878	10.23
69	Nagar	Adityendra	JP	16,235	37.13	Murad	INC	12,522	28.64	3,713	8.49
70	Deeg	Raja Man Singh	IND	14,776	34.91	Kanwar Sen	JP	11,372	26.86	3,404	8.05
71	Kumher	Kashi Nath	JP	17,600	41.94	Hoti Lal	INC	7,046	16.79	10,554	25.15
72	Bharatpur	Suresh Kumar	JP	21,112	48.22	Ram Swaroop Gupta	INC	7,789	17.79	13,323	30.43
73	Rupbas (SC)	Tara Chand	JP	15,322	48.74	Balwant Ram	INC	10,976	34.92	4,346	13.82
74	Nadbai	Hari Krishan	JP	22,146	47.99	Sujan Singh	INC	8,372	18.14	13,774	29.85
75	Weir (SC)	Ramji Lal	JP	18,078	53.30	Natha Singh	INC	10,928	32.22	7,150	21.08
76	Bayana	Mukat Behari Lal	JP	17,090	33.23	Shiv Charan Singh	IND	16,928	32.92	162	0.31
77	Rajakhera	Pradyuman Singh	IND	23,587	47.73	Mothan Prakash	JP	16,249	32.88	7,338	14.85
78	Dholpur	Jagdish Singh	JP	19,728	37.71	Banwari Lal	INC	18,935	36.19	793	1.52
79	Bari	Salig Ram	INC	18,867	35.22	Brij Raj Singh	JP	16,592	30.97	2,275	4.25
80	Karauli	Hans Ram	INC	15,786	36.84	Udo Singh	JP	12,649	29.52	3,137	7.32
81	Sapotra (ST)	Rangji	JP	17,720	46.14	Ram Kumar	INC	12,403	32.30	5,317	13.84
82	Khandar (SC)	Chunni Lal	JP	23,187	64.16	Ram Gopal	INC	10,386	28.74	12,801	35.42
83	Sawai Madhopur	Manzoor Ali	JP	21,794	54.40	Nathu Singh	INC	16,222	40.49	5,572	13.91
84	Bamanwas (ST)	Kunji Lal	JP	24,883	51.03	Bharat Lal	INC	19,297	39.58	5,586	11.45
85	Gangapur	Govind Sahai	JP	26,679	55.17	Harish Chandra Paliwal	INC	20,199	41.77	6,480	13.40
86	Hindaun (SC)	Sharwan Lal	JP	18,401	50.04	Ummedi Lal	INC	16,357	44.48	2,044	5.56
87	Mahuwa	Umrao Singh	JP	13,735	29.87	Chhuttan Lal	INC	12,861	27.97	874	1.90
88	Toda Bhim (ST)	Batti Lal	JP	30,049	63.80	Chet Ram	INC	11,206	23.79	18,843	40.01
89	Niwai (SC)	Jai Narayan	JP	24,119	69.00	Ram Nath Raghunath	INC	9,066	25.94	15,053	43.06
90	Tonk	Ajit Singh	JP	23,669	57.33	Altaf Hussain	INC	14,928	36.16	8,741	21.17
91	Uniara	Digvijai Singh	JP	21,591	57.27	Moti Lal Mina	INC	10,051	26.66	11,540	30.61
92	Todaraisingh	Gordhan	JP	27,279	63.02	Surendra Prasad	INC	12,759	29.48	14,520	33.54
93	Malpura	Narain Singh	JP	31,915	65.52	Ram Dayal	INC	13,038	26.77	18,877	38.75
94	Kishangarh	Kartar Singh	JP	30,678	62.09	Kesri Chand Choudhary	INC	14,164	28.67	16,514	33.42
95	Ajmer East (SC)	Kalyan Singh	JP	23,854	65.92	Ram Babu Shubram	INC	10,183	28.14	13,671	37.78
96	Ajmer West	Nawal Rai	JP	22,641	63.52	Kishan Motwani	INC	10,517	29.50	12,124	34.02
97	Pushkar	Chiranji Lal	JP	18,943	48.88	Hanuwant Singh Rawat	INC	17,150	44.26	1,793	4.62
98	Nasirabad	Bhanwar Lal Airun	JP	15,340	39.71	Govind Singh	INC	15,201	39.35	139	0.36
99	Beawar	Ugamraj	JP	20,157	50.45	Keshri Mal	CPI	16,141	40.40	4,016	10.05
100	Masuda	Noora	CPI	18,070	47.48	Ganga Singh	JP	13,502	35.47	4,568	12.01
101	Bhinai	Rattan Lal	JP	21,026	61.22	Rameshwar Lal	INC	7,545	21.97	13,481	39.25
102	Kekri (SC)	Mohan Lal	JP	22,886	61.57	Bhagwati Devi	INC	9,289	24.99	13,597	36.58
103	Hindoli	Ganesh Lal	JP	20,668	68.59	Prabhu Lal	INC	7,878	26.14	12,790	42.45
104	Nainwa	Manak Lal	JP	21,755	75.92	Ram Narain	INC	6,900	24.08	14,855	51.84
105	Patan (SC)	Gopal	JP	21,385	69.95	Kalyan Mal	INC	8,523	27.88	12,862	42.07
106	Bundi	Om Prakash	JP	25,220	68.87	Brij Sunder	INC	10,629	29.02	14,591	39.85
107	Kota	Lalit Kishore	JP	28,206	62.26	Abdul Hameed	IND	8,630	19.05	19,576	43.21
108	Ladpura	Purshottam	JP	20,123	56.67	Ram Kishan	INC	7,747	21.82	12,376	34.85
109	Digod	Dou Dayal Joshi	JP	34,200	72.63	Purushottam Lal Soral	INC	11,521	24.47	22,679	48.16
110	Pipalda (SC)	Hira Lal Arya	JP	24,754	67.96	Daya Ram	INC	9,285	25.49	15,469	42.47
111	Baran	Raghubir Singh	JP	29,526	67.32	Shiv Narain	INC	12,519	28.55	17,007	38.77
112	Kishanganj (ST)	Narangi Devi	JP	18,063	57.46	Har Sahai	INC	11,878	37.79	6,185	19.67
113	Atru (SC)	Onkar Lal	JP	20,617	60.14	Ramcharan	INC	7,933	23.14	12,684	37.00
114	Chhabra	Prem Singh	JP	33,302	79.28	Kishori Lal	INC	8,246	19.63	25,056	59.65
115	Ramganjmandi	Harish Kumar	JP	24,235	67.59	Bhawani Singh	INC	7,613	21.23	16,622	46.36
116	Khanpur	Bhairav Lal	JP	16,565	58.18	Daulat Singh	IND	4,569	16.05	11,996	42.13
117	Manohar Thana	Vithal Prasad Sharma	JP	19,040	71.00	Rustam Khan	IND	3,948	14.72	15,092	56.28
118	Jhalrapatan	Nirmal Kumar	JP	30,192	73.87	Jhujhar Singh	INC	8,597	21.03	21,595	52.84
119	Pirawa	Ishwar Chandra	JP	20,934	47.06	Shodan Singh	INC	12,385	27.84	8,549	19.22
120	Dag (SC)	Bal Chand Arya	JP	26,567	66.47	Deep Chand	INC	13,400	33.53	13,167	32.94
121	Begun	H. N. Sharma	JP	23,173	70.03	Ghisa Lal Dhakad	INC	7,739	23.39	15,434	46.64
122	Gangrar (SC)	Mangi Lal	JP	15,374	66.24	Bheru Lal	INC	7,140	30.77	8,234	35.47
123	Kapasin	Shyama Kumari	JP	24,810	63.31	Mohan Lal	INC	11,116	28.37	13,694	34.94
124	Chittorgarh	Laxma Singh	JP	33,290	76.08	Nirmala Kumari	INC	10,465	23.92	22,825	52.16
125	Nimbahera	Padam Singh	JP	32,972	63.57	Srinivas	INC	14,222	27.42	18,750	36.15
126	Badi Sadri	Vridhi Chand	JP	27,090	74.02	Shankar Lal	INC	6,492	17.74	20,598	56.28
127	Pratapgarh (ST)	Kalu	JP	23,267	71.57	Har Lal	INC	9,244	28.43	14,023	43.14
128	Kushalgarh (ST)	Jithing	JP	25,218	68.29	Hira Lal	INC	7,757	21.01	17,461	47.28
129	Danpur (ST)	Bahadur Singh	JP	33,896	76.95	Manji	INC	10,155	23.05	23,741	53.90
130	Ghatol (ST)	Nahtu Lal	JP	29,414	68.76	Punji Lal	INC	13,362	31.24	16,052	37.52
131	Banswara	Hari Deo Joshi	INC	23,407	57.10	Keshav Chandra	JP	17,586	42.90	5,821	14.20
132	Bagidora (ST)	Nathu Ram	JP	20,545	53.09	Nathu Ram R/o Bawadi	INC	10,265	26.53	10,280	26.56
133	Sagwara (ST)	Lal Shankar	JP	18,473	49.82	Bhikha Bhai	INC	15,798	42.61	2,675	7.21
134	Chorasi (ST)	Heera Lal	JP	20,522	62.39	Govind Amaliya	INC	9,945	30.23	10,577	32.16
135	Dungarpur (ST)	Amrat Lal	JP	18,570	67.10	Sunder Lal	CPI	4,404	15.91	14,166	51.19
136	Aspur (ST)	Bhimji	INC	21,519	51.74	Hakra	JP	19,295	46.39	2,224	5.35
137	Lasadia (ST)	Narayan	JP	16,427	64.73	Dhula	INC	8,952	35.27	7,475	29.46
138	Vallabhnagar	Kamlendra Singh	JP	35,984	74.97	Gulab Sngh Shaktawat	INC	11,261	23.46	24,723	51.51
139	Mavli	Narendra Pal Singh	JP	25,579	66.99	Gulab Bai	IND	10,693	28.00	14,886	38.99
140	Rajsamand (SC)	Kailash Chandra	JP	28,130	65.40	Nana Lal	INC	14,444	33.58	13,686	31.82
141	Nathdwara	Navneet Kumar	JP	28,584	67.51	Manohar Kothari	INC	13,757	32.49	14,827	35.02
142	Udaipur	Gulab Chand	JP	31,419	72.75	Hira Lal Devpura	INC	10,197	23.61	21,222	49.14
143	Udaipur Rural (ST)	Nand Lal	JP	20,263	67.36	Jai Narain	INC	9,818	32.64	10,445	34.72
144	Salumber (ST)	Mavji	JP	15,912	66.62	Than Singh	INC	7,972	33.38	7,940	33.24
145	Sarada (ST)	Gamir Lal	JP	16,130	56.02	Devendra Kumar	INC	12,276	42.63	3,854	13.39
146	Kherwara (ST)	Survya Prakash	JP	13,370	51.35	Man Singh	INC	9,974	38.31	3,396	13.04
147	Phalasia (ST)	Lalu	JP	13,475	59.95	Alkha Ram	INC	6,445	28.67	7,030	31.28
148	Gongunda (ST)	Bhura Lal	JP	12,783	59.38	Meghraj	CPI	8,743	40.62	4,040	18.76
149	Kumbhalgarh	Govind Singh Shaktawat	JP	23,215	62.00	Rameshwar Lal Asawa	INC	11,834	31.61	11,381	30.39
150	Bhim	Major Fateh Singh	JP	27,036	61.98	Rasa Singh	INC	16,584	38.02	10,452	23.96
151	Mandal	Ram Prasad Ladha	JP	19,053	52.14	Vijay Singh Rathora	INC	12,504	34.22	6,549	17.92
152	Sahada	Ram Chandra Jet	JP	19,544	47.75	Jawahar Mal Jet	INC	15,519	37.92	4,025	9.83
153	Bhilwara	Kaushal Kishore Jain	JP	26,532	61.76	Devendra Singh	INC	12,668	29.49	13,864	32.27
154	Mandalgarh	Manohar Singh	JP	25,117	62.23	Shiv Charan	INC	12,526	31.03	12,591	31.20
155	Jahazpur	Trilok Chand	JP	25,064	61.56	Ratan Lal Tambi	INC	12,551	30.83	12,513	30.73
156	Shahpura (SC)	Bhairu	JP	18,869	61.65	Debi	INC	11,394	37.22	7,475	24.43
157	Banera	Umrao Singh Dhabria	JP	19,373	68.16	Kalyan Mal Dhaibhai	INC	6,859	24.13	12,514	44.03
158	Asind	Vijendra Pal Singh	JP	14,870	32.76	Jagan Nath Prasad	INC	12,310	27.12	2,560	5.64
159	Jaitaran	Shankar Lal	INC	18,660	49.18	Narain Singh	JP	16,615	43.79	2,045	5.39
160	Raipur	Sukh Lal	INC	14,629	40.18	Kesa Ram	JP	11,436	31.41	3,193	8.77
161	Sojat	Madhav Singh	INC	17,181	39.67	Rajendra Singh	JP	16,686	38.53	495	1.14
162	Kharchi	Khangar Singh Ch.	JP	16,660	41.84	Chhoga Lal	INC	11,584	29.09	5,076	12.75
163	Desuri (SC)	Achla Ram	JP	20,915	53.27	Dinesh Rai Dangi	INC	13,451	34.26	7,464	19.01
164	Pali	Mool Chand Daga	INC	18,306	40.37	Chhoga Lal Gadiya	JP	15,324	33.79	2,982	6.58
165	Sumerpur	Vigyan Modi	JP	19,150	46.23	Sajjan Singh	INC	15,824	38.20	3,326	8.03
166	Bali	Hanwant Singh	JP	15,438	42.32	Mohan Raj	INC	13,334	36.55	2,104	5.77
167	Sirohi	Raghu Nandan Vyas	JP	18,523	44.38	Ram Lal	INC	17,458	41.83	1,065	2.55
168	Pindwara Abu (ST)	Alda Ram	JP	12,485	44.38	Bhura Ram	INC	11,637	41.36	848	3.02
169	Reodar (SC)	Madho Singh	INC	12,159	44.18	Vijay Singh	JP	9,850	35.79	2,309	8.39
170	Sanchore	Raghu Nath	INC	30,045	52.51	Bijala Ram	JP	26,053	45.54	3,992	6.97
171	Raniwara	Ratana Ram	INC	23,277	59.80	Hari Shankar	JP	15,649	40.20	7,628	19.60
172	Bhinmal	Suraj Pal Singh	INC	17,212	50.42	Aai Dan Singh	JP	12,920	37.85	4,292	12.57
173	Jalore (SC)	Teekam Chand Kant	JP	15,902	50.13	Bhura Ram	INC	12,481	39.34	3,421	10.79
174	Ahore	Gopal Singh	JP	21,175	47.68	Bhagraj Choudhary	INC	21,157	47.64	18	0.04
175	Siwana (SC)	Chaina Ram	JP	17,868	50.91	Jesa Ram	INC	16,871	48.07	997	2.84
176	Pachpadra	Madan Kaur	INC	27,042	52.11	Champa Lal Bhathia	JP	24,577	47.36	2,465	4.75
177	Barmer	Virdhi Chand	INC	26,729	58.37	Ummed Singh	JP	17,892	39.07	8,837	19.30
178	Gudamalani	Ganga Ram Chodhary	INC	24,917	64.39	Poonam Chand	JP	12,728	32.89	12,189	31.50
179	Chohtan	Abdul Hadi	INC	25,485	54.96	Abdul Haq	JP	10,152	21.89	15,333	33.07
180	Sheo	Kan Singh	JP	12,680	32.89	Taga Ram Choudhary	INC	12,155	31.53	525	1.36
181	Jaisalmer	Kishan Singh Bhati	JP	23,185	62.09	Sohan Singh Ravalot	INC	12,322	33.00	10,863	29.09
182	Shergarh	Khet Singh	INC	18,097	47.08	Anop Singh	IND	14,970	38.94	3,127	8.14
183	Jodhpur	Birad Mal Singhvi	JP	25,038	48.73	H. K. Vyas	CPI	16,253	31.63	8,785	17.10
184	Sardarpura	Madho Singh	JP	21,322	53.26	Ashok Kumar	INC	16,993	42.45	4,329	10.81
185	Sursagar (SC)	Narpat Ram Barwad	INC	18,411	49.63	Mohan Lal	JP	16,928	45.63	1,483	4.00
186	Luni	Ram Singh Vishoni	INC	25,702	57.45	Ram Narain Vishnoi	JP	19,036	42.55	6,666	14.90
187	Bilara	Ram Narain	INC	21,695	43.62	Ummed Ram	JP	13,905	27.95	7,790	15.67
188	Bhopalgarh	Paras Ram Maderna	INC	26,558	50.67	Bhera Ram	JP	25,856	49.33	702	1.34
189	Osian	Ranjeet Singh	INC	20,141	50.33	Banney Singh	JP	18,800	46.98	1,341	3.35
190	Phalodi	Balkrishan	JP	22,048	47.24	Poonam Chand Vishnoi	INC	21,061	45.13	987	2.11
191	Nagaur	Bansi Lal	JP	22,559	50.49	Mohammad Usman	INC	19,968	44.69	2,591	5.80
192	Jayal (SC)	Mangi Lal	INC	14,704	40.09	Mohan Singh	JP	13,503	36.82	1,201	3.27
193	Ladnu	Harji Ram	JP	28,084	62.10	Deepankar	INC	13,021	28.79	15,063	33.31
194	Deedwana	Mathura Das	INC	26,576	52.57	Jabodi Khan	JP	23,976	47.43	2,600	5.14
195	Nawan	Rameshwar Lal	INC	18,398	38.86	Bhanwar Singh	JP	17,430	36.81	968	2.05
196	Makrana	Abdul Aziz	INC	28,529	52.90	Kalyan Singh	JP	24,409	45.26	4,120	7.64
197	Parbatsar (SC)	Jeth Mal	INC	24,954	55.72	Parkash Chandra	JP	18,010	40.21	6,944	15.51
198	Degana	Ram Raghu Nath	INC	30,858	52.78	Ram Sukh	JP	26,738	45.73	4,120	7.05
199	Merta	Ram Lal	INC	29,819	52.27	Gordan Soni	JP	24,326	42.64	5,493	9.63
200	Mundwa	Ram Deo	INC	24,713	53.24	Ram Prakash	JP	20,877	44.98	3,836	8.26

== See also ==
- List of constituencies of the Rajasthan Legislative Assembly
- 1977 elections in India
