= Rajesh Kachhap =

Indian politician

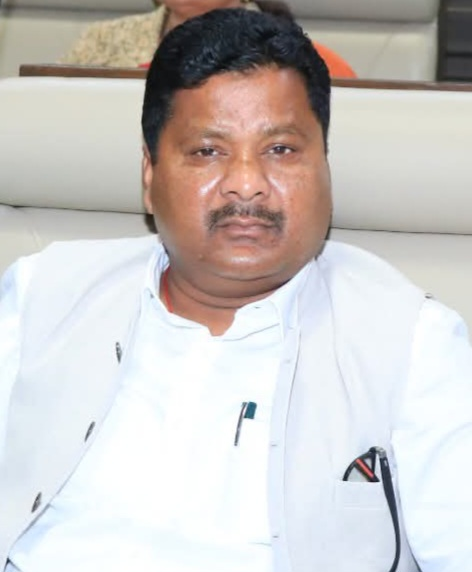

Deputy CLP leader in Jharkhand Legislative Assembly
- Incumbent
- Assumed office 2024

Member of the Jharkhand Legislative Assembly
- Incumbent
- Assumed office 2019
- Preceded by: Ram Kumar Pahan
- Constituency: Khijri

Personal details
- Party: Indian National Congress

Rajesh Kachhap is an Indian politician who is serving as a Member of the Jharkhand Legislative Assembly from the Khijri representing the Indian National Congress in 2019 Jharkhand Legislative Assembly election.
