= Chhotanagpur Plateau Praja Parishad =

Political party in Bihar, India

Chhotanagpur Plateau Praja Parishad (Chhotanagpur Plateau Popular Council) was an Adivasi political party in Bihar, India. It was one of several splinter groups that appeared 1967–1972, after the Jharkhand Party had merged into the Indian National Congress.
