= Krantikari Mukti Morcha =

Krantikari Mukti Morcha (Hindi: क्रान्तिकारी मुक्ति मोर्चा, 'Revolutionary Liberation Front') was an Adivasi political party in Bihar, India. It was one of several splinter groups that appeared 1967–1972, after the Jharkhand Party had merged into the Indian National Congress.
