= Sudeep Gudhiya =

Indian politician

Member of the Jharkhand Legislative Assembly
- Incumbent
- Assumed office 23 November 2024
- Preceded by: Koche Munda
- Constituency: Torpa

Personal details
- Political party: Jharkhand Mukti Morcha
- Profession: Politician

Sudeep Gudhiya is an Indian politician from Jharkhand. He is a member of the Jharkhand Legislative Assembly from 2024, representing Torpa Assembly constituency as a member of the Jharkhand Mukti Morcha.

== See also ==
- List of chief ministers of Jharkhand
- Jharkhand Legislative Assembly
