= Anosh Ekka =

Indian politician

Member of Jharkhand Legislative Assembly
- In office 2005–2018
- Succeeded by: Naman Bixal Kongari
- Constituency: Kolebira

Personal details
- Party: Jharkhand Party

Anosh Ekka (also spelled as Enos Ekka) is a politician and former Cabinet Minister in the Jharkhand Government.

Currently, Shri Anosh Ekka serves as the National President (Supremo) of the Jharkhand Party. He is a well-known and influential politician in Jharkhand, having been a member of the Jharkhand Legislative Assembly from 2005 to 2018. Anosh Ekka won the Kolebira Vidhan Sabha seat in three consecutive terms: 2005, 2009, and 2014, as a candidate from the Jharkhand Party. He served as a Cabinet Minister in the Jharkhand government from 2005 to 2008 under the leadership of Arjun Munda and Madhu Koda. During his tenure, Ekka held various portfolios, including Transport Minister, Rural Development Minister, and Bhavan Nirman Minister. Many developmental projects and schemes were launched in Jharkhand during his ministry. In the 2014 Member of Parliament elections, Anosh Ekka narrowly lost the election for the Khunti Lok Sabha seat as a Jharkhand Party candidate.

In 2006, Anosh Ekka played a key role in the formation of the Madhu Koda Government. Both Anosh Ekka and Madhu Koda are recognized as popular and influential tribal leaders in Jharkhand.

He was jailed in 2020.
