= Jaglal Choudhary =

Indian politician (1895–1975)

Personal details
- Born: 5 February 1895
- Died: 1975 (aged 79–80) Bihar, India
- Political party: Indian National Congress

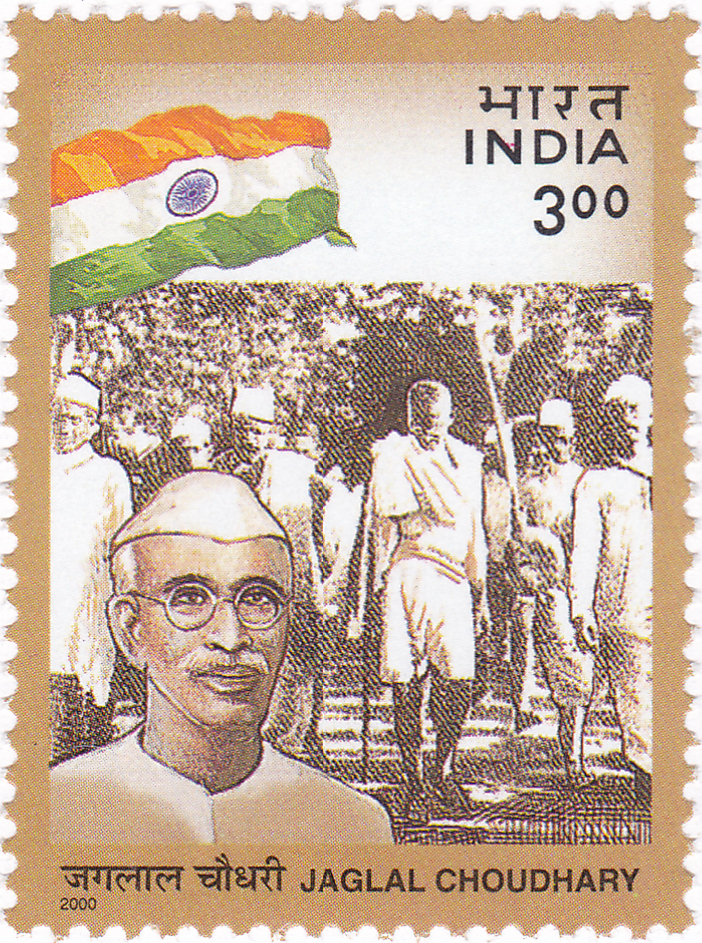
Choudhary on a 2000 stamp of India

Jaglal Choudhary (5 February 1895 – 1975) was an Indian independence activist, Pasi leader and politician from Bihar, India. He was also a reformer who championed the causes of women's rights, emancipation of dalits, education and land reforms in Bihar.

== Freedom fighter ==
Choudhary discontinued his medical education and joined the Non-Cooperation Movement in 1921 heeding Gandhi's call. He became a member of the District Congress Committee and was arrested for his participation in the Salt Satyagraha. In 1941 he was arrested and jailed for taking part in the Individual Satyagraha and in 1942 at the height of the Quit India Movement he led a satyagraha and captured the police station and post office at Garkha. For this he was arrested and sentenced to five years imprisonment. One of Choudhary's sons was shot dead by the police during the movement. From 23 August 1942 until his release on 30 March 1946 Choudhary remained in prison.

== Reformer ==
Choudhary was an advocate of social reform in Bihar. During his term as excise minister, he introduced prohibition in Bihar. He was opposed to the caste system and advocated land reforms in Bihar calling for a land ceiling of three acres per family. In 1953 he wrote A Plan to Reconstruct Bharat.

== Death and commemoration ==
Jaglal Choudhary died in 1975. The Jaglal Choudhary College in Chapra is named after him. A commemorative postage stamp on Jaglal Choudhary was released the Department of Posts in 2000.
