= Jaipal Singh Munda =

Indian politician, writer, and sportsman (1903–1970)

Member of Parliament, Lok Sabha
- In office 1952–1970
- Preceded by: seat established
- Succeeded by: Niral Enem Horo
- Constituency: Ranchi (West)/ Khunti (Note: The Ranchi (West) constituency was reorganised as Khunti from 1967 Indian general election.)

Personal details
- Born: Jaipal Singh; 3 January 1903 Takra Pahantoli, Ranchi, Bengal presidency, British India (now Khunti district, Jharkhand)
- Died: 20 March 1970 (aged 67) New Delhi, India
- Party: Indian National Congress (1963–1970); Jharkhand Party (1949/1950–1963)
- Other political affiliations: Adivasi Mahasabha (1939–1949/1950)
- Spouse(s): Tara Wienfried Majumdar (m. 1931) Jahanara Jeyaratnam (m. 1954)
- Education: Bachelor of Economics
- Alma mater: St John's College, Oxford
- Field hockey career
- Sport: Field hockey
- Position: Defender
Senior career
| Years | Team | Caps | Goals |
| – | Wimbledon Hockey Club | - | - |
National team
| Years | Team | Caps | Goals |
| – | India | | - |
Medal record
Men's Field Hockey
Representing India
Olympic Games
| Gold medal – first place | 1928 Amsterdam | Team Competition |

Jaipal Singh Munda (3 January 1903 – 20 March 1970) was an Indian politician, writer, and sportsman. He was a member of the Constituent Assembly, which debated the new Constitution of the Indian Union. He also captained the Indian field hockey team to a gold medal at the 1928 Summer Olympics in Amsterdam.

Later, he emerged as a campaigner for the causes of Adivasis and the creation of a separate homeland for them in central India. He is popularly known as "Marang Gomke" (meaning Great Leader in Munda language) by the Adivasis of Chhotanagpur.

== Early life ==
Jaipal Singh Munda, also known as Pramod Pahan, was born to Radhamani and Amru Pahan in a Christian Munda family, on 3 January 1903 in Takra-Hatudami, Pahan Toli village, which was then part of the Khunti subdivision (now a district) of Ranchi in the Bengal presidency of British India (present-day Jharkhand).

During his childhood, Munda's tended his family's cattle herd. After receiving his early education in the village, he was brought by Rev. Kushalmai Sheetal to St. Paul's Church School. In 1910, he gained admission to St. Paul's School, Ranchi, which was run by the Christian missionaries of the SPG Mission of the Church of England. He played field hockey and was noted for leadership qualities from a young age. The missionaries subsequently arranged for him to study in England, where he earned Honours in Economics from St. John's College, Oxford.

Munda was part of the Indian hockey team for the 1928 Olympic Games. Under his captaincy, the team played 17 league-stage matches, winning 16 and drawing one. However, due to a dispute with the English team manager, A. B. Rosser, Munda left the team after the league phase and could not participate in the knockout stage. In the final, the Indian team defeated Holland 3–0 to win the gold medal.

After returning to India, Munda became associated with Mohan Bagan Club of Calcutta and established its hockey team in 1929, leading them in various tournaments. Following his retirement from active hockey, he served as the Secretary of Bengal Hockey Association and as a member of the Indian Sports Council.

== Career ==
Jaipal Singh Munda was selected to work in the Indian Civil Service, from which he later resigned. In 1934, he became a teacher at the Prince of Wales College at Achimota, Gold Coast, Ghana. In 1937, he returned to India as the Principal of the Rajkumar College, Raipur. In 1938, he joined the Bikaner princely state as foreign secretary.

Munda thought that with his varied experience he could be more useful to the country if he worked in the sphere of education. He wrote letters to the Bihar Congress President, Rajendra Prasad, asking to be allowed to contribute to Bihar's education sector, but received no positive answers. In the last month of 1938, Munda visited Patna and Ranchi. During this visit, he decided to enter politics by seeing the poor condition of the tribal people.

Munda became president of Adivasi Mahasabha in 1939. In 1940 at Ramgarh session of Congress, he discussed with Subash Chandra Bose the need to form separate state Jharkhand. Subash Chandra Bose replied that such request will affect the freedom struggle. In the 1946 Indian provincial elections, he lost the Khunti constituency to Congress candidate P.C. Mitra. However, he was subsequently elected to the Constituent Assembly of India in the Constituent Assembly election by the Bihar Legislative Assembly to represent tribal communities in drafting the Constitution of India. After the independence of India, the Adivasi Mahasabha re-emerged as Jharkhand Party in 1949-50 and it accommodated non-tribal people to achieve long-term goals.

Electoral history
| Election | House | Constituency | Party | Votes | % | Result |
|---|---|---|---|---|---|---|
| 1967 | Lok Sabha | Khunti | INC | 46,737 | 25.99 | Won |
| 1962 | Lok Sabha | Ranchi West | JKP | 103,310 | 52.56 | Won |
| 1957 | Lok Sabha | Ranchi West | JKP | 139,197 | 60.25 | Won |
| 1951 | Lok Sabha | Ranchi West | JKP | 139,275 | 60.86 | Won |
| 1946 | Bihar Legislative Assembly | Khunti | n/a | n/a | n/a | Lost |

He contested the first general election of independent India from Ranchi (West) as a candidate of the Jharkhand Party and won with a 60.85% vote share. The Jharkhand Party also won 32 seats and became the main opposition party in the 1952 Bihar Legislative Assembly election. In 1955, the party submitted a memorandum to the States Reorganization Commission, advocating for the creation of a separate Jharkhand state comprising the tribal regions of South Bihar. The proposal was not accepted due to the region’s linguistic diversity, the absence of a common link language, the minority status of the tribal population, and concerns about the economic implications of such a separation. However, In the subsequent assembly elections of 1957 and 1962, the party’s representation declined, with 31 and 20 seats won, respectively. Similar his vote share declined to 60.25% and 52.56% in the 1957 and 1962 general election, subsequently, through he managed to remain in seat.

Munda fied with the declining popularity of the Jharkhand Party and the rejection of the demand for a separate state by the States Reorganization Commission, merged the party with the Indian National Congress in 1963. However, not all members of the party’s rank and file joined the Congress. Following the merger, he contested the 1967 general election from the Khunti Lok Sabha constituency (reorganized from the previous Ranchi (West) constituency) as a Congress candidate. He won the election with a 25.98% vote share, in margin of 5,277 votes and remained in office until his death in 1970.

=== Role in the Constituent Assembly debates ===
Munda was a gifted speaker and represented the tribal population of India at the Constituent Assembly, which was responsible for drafting the Constitution of India. The following is an excerpt from a famous speech made by him, where, while welcoming the Objectives Resolution, he highlighted the issues faced by the Indian tribals:

As an Adivasi, I am not expected to understand the legal intricacies of the Resolution. But my common sense tells me that every one of us should march in that road to freedom and fight together. Sir, if there is any group of Indian people that has been shabbily treated it is my people. They have been disgracefully treated, neglected for the last 6,000 years. The history of the Indus Valley civilization, a child of which I am, shows quite clearly that it is the newcomers — most of you here are intruders as far as I am concerned — it is the new comers who have driven away my people from the Indus Valley to the jungle fastness ... The whole history of my people is one of continuous exploitation and dispossession by the non-aboriginals of India punctuated by rebellions and disorder, and yet I take Pandit Jawahar Lal Nehru at his word. I take you all at your word that now we are going to start a new chapter, a new chapter of independent India where there is equality of opportunity, where no one would be neglected.

Jaipal Singh was a part of 3 Committees including Advisory Committee. A seven-member delegation of Naga leaders consisting of Angami Zapu Phizo, T. Sakhrie, Kezehol and others went to Delhi in July 1947 to declare their intention of a sovereign, independent Naga territory. There, they met Muhammad Ali Jinnah, Mahatma Gandhi, as well as Munda, who warned the Nagas against the folly of fighting a war against the Government of India forces. As a precautionary measure, 3000 Assam Rifles troops were already stationed in the Naga Hills by then. During a Constituent Assembly debate, Singh rebuked the Nagas for seeking Independence. He pointed out that the situation in the Naga Hills might become very serious and dangerous soon. Along with others in the Interim Government, he had received a few telegraphs on the intention of the Nagas declaring independence. He stated,

The Naga Hills have always been part of India and have never been anything like the Indian States; but the Nagas have been led to believing that they are not part of India and that as soon as the Dominion of India comes into being, the Naga Hills could be exclusively the property of the State of the Nagas... Those of us who came into contact with them [Nagas leaders who went to Delhi to represent their case] tried to tell them the plain truth. But I think it is necessary that something should be said on the floor of this Assembly clarifying the position... [In the latest telegram the Naga leaders rejected] an offer from the Assembly to come into the Union. There has been no question of any offer. No offer was necessary or called for. The Naga Hills have always been a part of India and will remain so.

== Personal life ==
Jaipal Singh Munda married Tara Wienfried Majumdar, the daughter of P. K. Majumdar and Janaki Agnes Penelope Majumdar (daughter of Hemangini and W. C. Bonnerjee, the president of Indian National Congress), in a Christian marriage ceremony in Darjeeling in 1931. He and Tara had three children: two sons Birendra and Jayant, and a daughter, Janki. Tara Majumdar was a cousin of General Jayanto Nath Chaudhuri and a granddaughter of Congress President Womesh Chunder Bonnerjee. Munda’s second marriage was to Jahanara Jeyaratnam, the daughter of a Sri Lankan Tamil who joined the Indian Civil service in 1954. He had one son with Jahanara, Ranjit Jeyaratnam.

Jaipal Singh Munda died of cerebral hemorrhage on 20 March 1970 at his residence in New Delhi. He was 67, and left behind four children — a daughter and three sons. One of his sons is Jayant Jaypal Singh. He is the CEO of Calcutta cricket and football club.

== Legacy ==
A stadium named after him opened in Ranchi in 2013.

Jaipal Singh Munda stadium was opened in Indira Gandhi National Tribal University, Amarakntak by VC Prof. T.V. Kattimani in 2019.

"Marang Gomke Jaipal Singh Munda Overseas Scholarship" -Recently the state government of Jharkhand under the able leadership of Chief Minister of Jharkhand Shri Hemant Soren has announced and launched an overseas scholarship scheme for students of Jharkhand to pursue master's degree and M.Phil. course in reputed institutions in the United Kingdom of Great Britain and Ireland. This scholarship is fully funded and the government of Jharkhand has also signed an MoU with the Government of England for educating the youths of Jharkhand, especially from the scheduled tribes, scheduled castes, minorities and backward classes. This scholarship is named after the great leader Jaipal Singh Munda in which the government aims to uplift the students belonging to socially and economically vulnerable groups and give them opportunity for a quality education henceforth bringing hope in the lives of youths of Jharkhand and instilling in them the thought to give back to their state and being a part of Jharkhand developmental story. In the year 2022, about 20 students were selected for this prestigious scholarship and these students are currently pursuing their courses in reputed institutions of United Kingdom.

== Published works ==
- Lo Bir Sendra : an autobiography : A memoir of Jaipal Singh Munda published in 2004. Edited by Rashmi Katyayan and published by Prabhat Khabar Publications, Ranchi.
- Adivasidom: a collection of the articles and speeches of Jaipal Singh Munda, written in the 1940-50s, published in July 2017. Edited by Ashwini Kumar Pankaj and it was published by the Pyara Kerketta Foundation, Ranchi.

== See also ==
- List of Indian hockey captains in Olympics
- Field hockey in India
