= Naman Bixal Kongari =

Indian politician

Member of the Jharkhand Legislative Assembly
- Incumbent
- Assumed office 2018
- Preceded by: Anosh Ekka
- Constituency: Kolebira

Personal details
- Born: Simdega, Jharkhand
- Party: Indian National Congress
- Spouse: Vinita Jojo
- Children: 1
- Parent: Nikodim Kolgari (Father)
- Occupation: Politician

Naman Bixal Kongari is an Indian politician from the Indian National Congress. He is the state legislative assembly member from Kolebira 2018.
