= All India Jharkhand Party =

Political party in India

- President: Bagun Sumbrai
- Founder: David Munzni
- Founded: 19 May 1968 (57 years ago)
- Preceded by: Jharkhand Party
- Ideology: Regionalism
- ECI Status: Unrecognised Party

All India Jharkhand Party is a political party in India. The party was founded by David Munzni on May 19, 1968 after merger of Jharkhand Party with Indian National Congress in 1963. Bagun Sumbrai was chosen as president and N.E. Horo as general secretary.

The party participated in two Lok Sabha elections in 1971 and 1972, two Bihar Legislative Assembly elections in 1972 and 1977, and three elections in Odisha in 1971, 1974, and 1977 alongside the Jharkhand Party. The membership was predominantly Christian, but there was also a large group of non-Christians. The party was later crippled through ethnic fractionalism.
