= Koche Munda =

Indian politician

Koche Munda is an Indian politician and member of the Bharatiya Janata Party. Munda is a member of the Jharkhand Legislative Assembly from the Torpa constituency in Khunti district.
