= Jharkhand Anushilan Party =

- Leader: Aditya Kisku
- Founder: Aditya Kisku
- Founded: 1968
- Headquarters: Jhilimilli village, Barikul, Bankura District, West Bengal, India
- Ideology: Regionalism
- ECI Status: Unrecognised Party

The Jharkhand Anushilan Party (abbr. JAP), previously known as Jharkhand Party (Aditya), is a political party in West Bengal, India. The party demands that Jangal Mahal be declared an autonomous region within West Bengal. Aditya Kisku is the general secretary of the party.
