= Ignace Beck =

Indian politician

Member of Parliament, Lok Sabha
- In office 1957–1962
- Succeeded by: David Munzni
- Constituency: Lohardaga, Bihar

Member of Provincial Assembly, Bihar
- In office 1937–1951

Personal details
- Born: January 1896 Konkel
- Died: 31 August 1964 (aged 70) Ranchi, Bihar
- Party: Jharkhand Party
- Other political affiliations: Adivasi Mahasabha; Catholic Sabha
- Spouse: Shrimati Anjala (m. 1927)
- Children: 8 (incl. 2 daughter)
- Parent: Bede Beck (father)

Ignace Beck (also spelled Ignes) was an Indian politician. He was a Member of Parliament, representing Lohardaga, Bihar in the 2nd Lok Sabha as a member of the Jharkhand Party.

== Political career ==
Electoral history
Election	House	Constituency	Party	Votes	%	Result
1957	Lok Sabha	Lohardaga (ST)	JKP	50,185	43.88	Won
1962	Lok Sabha	Lohardaga (ST)	JKP	31,744	24.10	Lost
