= Sawna Lakra =

Indian politician

Sawna Lakra (1941-2021) was an Indian politician from the Indian National Congress, elected to the state legislature in Jharkhand. He was arrested for murdering a youth to protect the family honour in May 2011.

He died on 14 October 2021.

== Arrest for Murder ==
In June 2011, Lakra was indicted for ordering the abduction and murder of Avinash Tiwari, a local youth who had wanted to marry his granddaughter Usha Lakra.

On 27 April, Avinash had come to Lakra's farmhouse at Chota Kawali, about 2 km from Bargama to meet Usha. He was caught and confined by Lakra's bodyguard Janak Mahto. Later, he was allegedly shot dead by henchman Gopi Kachchap, in Lakra's presence. The body was disposed of in a culvert near Lodhma.

Lakra went underground immediately after police investigations. He surrendered only after a month.

After his arrest, Lakra was to be held in the Birsa Munda Central Jail but he immediately claimed cardiac problems, and was sent to the intensive cardiac care unit (ICCU) of the premier Rajendra Institute of Medical Sciences (RIMS).
