= David Munzni =

Indian politician (1924–1987)

Member of Parliament, Lok Sabha
- In office 1962–1967
- Preceded by: Ignace Beck
- Succeeded by: Kartik Oraon
- Constituency: Lohardaga, Bihar

Personal details
- Born: 3 October 1924
- Died: 3 December 1987 (aged 63) Delhi, India
- Party: Indian National Congress

David Munzni (3 October 1924 – 3 December 1987) was an Indian politician. He was a Member of Parliament, representing Lohardaga, Bihar in the Lok Sabha the lower house of India's Parliament as a member of the Indian National Congress. Munzi died in Delhi on 3 December 1987, at the age of 63.

== Political career ==
Electoral history
Election	House	Constituency	Party	Votes	%	Result
1951	Lok Sabha	Palamu-cum-Hazaribagh-cum-Ranchi	Ind	26,583	5.74	Lost
1957	Lok Sabha	Lohardaga (ST)	Ind	18,990	16.60	Lost
1962	Lok Sabha	Lohardaga (ST)	SWA	58,174	44.16	Won
1967	Lok Sabha	Lohardaga (ST)	Ind	26,656	17.04	Lost
1971	Lok Sabha	Lohardaga (ST)	Ind	7,301	3.83	Lost
1972	Bihar Legislative Assembly	Mandar (ST)	Ind	6198	23.30	Lost
1977	Lok Sabha	Lohardaga (ST)	Ind	6,423	2.57	Lost
1980	Lok Sabha	Sundargarh (ST)	Ind	7,171	2.85	Lost
