= Boniface Lakra =

Indian Bihari Politician

Member of Constituent Assembly of India
- In office 9 December 1946 – 24 January 1950

Member of Provincial Assembly, Bihar
- In office 1937–1946
- Constituency: Gumla-cum-Simdega

Personal details
- Born: 4 March 1898 Doba, Kuru, Jharkhand
- Died: 8 December 1976 (aged 78)
- Party: Indian National Congress
- Other political affiliations: Catholic Sabha
- Education: Ravenshaw College (M.A.)

Boniface Lakra was an Indian politician. He was a member of the Constituent Assembly of India from Bihar. He was also a member of the Bihar Legislative Assembly.

== Early life ==
Boniface Lakra was born on 4 March 1898 in the Kuru area of present-day Jharkhand, into a Christian Oraon family. He completed his higher education with a degree in arts.

== Political career ==
In 1931, on the suggestion of Rev. Sevrin, Lakra founded the Chota Nagpur Roman Catholic Sabha and became its president. Representing the organisation with the support of the Indian National Congress, he won the 1934 general election and was elected to the Central Legislative Assembly. He was subsequently elected to the Bihar Legislative Assembly in the provincial elections of 1937 from the Gumla-cum-Simdega constituency. By virtue of his legislative position, he was indirectly elected to the Constituent Assembly of India in 1946. After independence, Lakra contested the 1951-52 Bihar Legislative Assembly election from the Chainpur Scheduled Tribe–reserved constituency as a Congress candidate but was defeated by Deocharan Manjhi of the Chota Nagpur Santhal Parganas Janata Party, losing by a margin of 23.39 percent.
