= Niral Enem Horo =

Indian politician

Member of the Lok Sabha
- In office 1971–1977
- Preceded by: Jaipal Singh
- Succeeded by: Karia Munda
- Constituency: Khunti

Personal details
- Born: 31 March 1925 Govindpur village, Ranchi district, Bihar
- Died: 11 December 2008 (aged 83)
- Party: Jharkhand Party
- Spouse: Lilian Alice Horo
- Children: 5 sons

Niral Enem Horo (1925–2008) was an Indian politician and a former member of the Lok Sabha. He represented Khunti in 4th and 5th Lok Sabha. He was associated with the Jharkhand Party and served as a minister in the government of Bihar. He was the losing candidate for Vice President of India in the 1974 election.

== Early life ==
Horo was born on March 31, 1925, to Abraham Horo at Govindpur village, Ranchi district. He began his education at Zila School, Ranchi. He earned a B.A. from St. Columba's College, Hazaribagh and a B.L. from Chotanagpur Law College in Ranchi. He married Lilian Alice Horo on March 15, 1951. The couple had five sons.

== Political career ==
Horo was associated with the Jharkhand Party from the beginning of his public life. He was minister of Education, Planning, and Public Relations in the government of Bihar from 1968 to 1969. He was a member of the Bihar Legislative Assembly from 1967 to 1970 and from 1977 to 1980. He was a member of the Lok Sabha in 1970 and from 1971 to 1976. Horo became the president of the Jharkhand Party in 1971.

Electoral history of Horo
Election	House	Constituency	Party	Votes	%	Result
2004	Lok Sabha	Khunti	JKP	31,924	6.5	Lost
1998	Lok Sabha	Khunti	JKP	43,569	9.41	Lost
1991	Lok Sabha	Khunti	JKP	80,209	23.38	Lost
2000	Bihar Legislative Assembly	Torpa	Ind	21,889	33.62	Lost
1990	Bihar Legislative Assembly	Torpa	JKP	24,571	43.97	Won
1985	Bihar Legislative Assembly	Torpa	Ind	19,159	44.68	Won
1969	Bihar Legislative Assembly	Torpa	Ind	12,451	40.21	Won
