= Jharkhand Party =

- Abbreviation: JKP
- Founder: Jaipal Singh Munda
- Founded: 5 March 1949 (77 years ago)
- Dissolved: 20 June 1963
- Preceded by: Adivasi Mahasabha
- Merged into: Indian National Congress
- Headquarters: Ranchi, Jharkhand
- Ideology: Jharkhand statehood; Indigenous rights; Regionalism
- Colours: Green
- ECI status: Registered
- Number of states and union territories in government: Jharkhand, Orissa, West Bengal

Election symbol
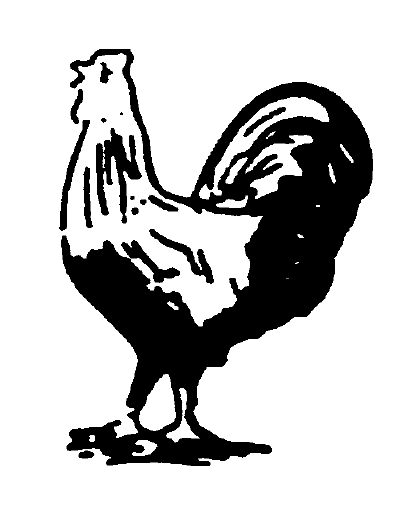

Website
- jharkhandparty.org (Note: The Jharkhand Party has used various domains for their website in the past, including www.jharkhandparty.com (archived), www.jharkhandparty.org (archived), and www.jharkhandparty.in (archived). However, these websites are now defunct, and no active official website is currently maintained.)

The Jharkhand Party (JKP) is one of the oldest political parties in India. formed on 5 March 1949 by Marang Gomke Jaipal Singh Munda in Ranchi. The party grew out of the demand for a separate Jharkhand state.

The Jharkhand Party participated in the Bihar Legislative Assembly elections of 1952, 1957, and 1962. For more than 15 years, the Jharkhand Party was the only major opposition political party against the Indian National Congress in Bihar. In 1955, the Jharkhand Party submitted a memorandum for the creation of a separate state of Jharkhand to the States Reorganization Commission, but the state was not created for linguistic and economic reasons.

== History ==
=== Formation ===
The 19th-century sociopolitical movement in the lower Chotanagpur region, initiated by tribals to address their issues, gave rise to several tribal rights organizations, predominantly led by educated Christian tribals. One of the earliest was the Chotanagpur Unnati Samaj, founded in 1915 by Rev. Joel Lakra with the help of Theble Oraon, Bandi Oraon and Paul Dayal, aimed at promoting education and social reform. The organization demanded autonomy and socio-cultural protection before the Simon Commission during its visit to Patna in 1928. Around the same time, the Chotanagpur Catholic Sabha was formed under the leadership of Boniface Lakra and Ignes Beck (1928–1929), while non-convert Munda tribals established the Munda Sabha in 1929, although it failed to garner broad support. In 1931, peasant group broke away from the Unnati Samaj and founded the Chotanagpur Kisan Sabha, with Laurentius Barla as president and Theble Oraon as secretary, focusing on agrarian and cultural concerns in the Oraon belts. Similarly, in the early 1930s, some tribal traditionalists established the Sarna Sabha and began articulating the "Sarna" ethno-religious identity bloc. Meanwhile, in April 1936, the Odia-speaking region was carved out of Bihar and Orissa Province as a separate province on linguistic grounds, while Chotanagpur remained in Bihar. By this time, through the efforts of Ignes Beck, the Unnati Samaj had reorganized as the Adivasi Sabha, a secular front for tribal consolidation in pursuit of political autonomy for Chotanagpur. However, with the rise of the Congress-led nationalist movement in India, regional political groups failed to gain a foothold. In Chotanagpur, only the Catholic Sabha managed limited success, winning two out of thirty-eight seats from Chotanagpur in the 1937 Bihar Legislative Assembly election, while other tribal groups failed to gain representation. This electoral setback revealed the fragmented nature of tribal politics and prompted calls for unity, and in May 1938 the Adivasi Mahasabha (lit. 'Great Assembly of Adivasis') was formed through consolidation of the Sabhas, with Theodore Surin as president and Paul Dayal as secretary. The Mahasabha, since then began advocating the idea of a Jharkhand state in the Bihar Legislative Assembly. At the Mahasabha's second annual session in Ranchi in January 1939, Jaipal Singh Munda was elected president. Following his election, the Mahasabha secured notable victories in the 1939 District Board elections, winning twenty seats in Singhbhum and sixteen in Ranchi. To support its political agenda and mobilization efforts beyond Ranchi and Singhbhum, the Mahasabha began publishing materials such as "Adivasi" and "Adivasi Sakam". (Note: The journal Adivasi was first published by the Unnati Samaj in 1932 from Ranchi and paused after its 8th edition in 1934. After the formation of the Adivasi Mahasabha in May 1938, it resumed with the 9th edition in September 1938. Adivasi Sakam, founded and edited by Jaipal Singh, was first published in July 1940 from Jamshedpur.)

However, dissatisfaction with Christian influence in the Mahasabha led to a split in July 1939, when Theble Oraon founded the Sanatan Adivasi Mahasabha to represent traditionalist, non-Christian tribals aligned with the nationalist movement. At the Ramgarh session of Congress in 1940, Munda discussed with Subash Chandra Bose regarding Jharkhand state. Amid rejection of Jharkhand statehood demand from influential political leaders and growing internal disagreements, the Mahasabha's performance declined in the 1946 Bihar Assembly elections, securing only three seats, with Jaipal Singh defeated by seating Congress candidate Dr. P. C. Mitra. However, in the 1946 Constituent Assembly elections, Jaipal Singh was indipendently elected to represent the tribal population during the drafting of the Constitution of India and, as a member of the Tribal Sub-Committee, advocated for tribal interests in the Assembly. In 1947, internal debates emerged within the Mahasabha regarding the inclusion of non-tribal populations, since tribals accounted less than half of the Chotanagpur population, although no consensus was reached. Eventually, at its session held in Ranchi on 5 March 1949, the Mahasabha was reorganized as the Jharkhand Party, with Jaipal Singh as president and Julius Tigga as secretary. Following India's independence on 15 August 1947 and the adoption of the Constitution on 26 November 1949, which provided reserved political representation in tribal-concentrated regions, the Jharkhand Party was formally launched to the public on 1 January 1950 in Jamshedpur, shifting from a tribal-centric organization to a broader regional movement advocating for a separate Jharkhand state.

=== Post-Independence ===
The Jharkhand Party participated in the 1952 election and won 34 seats in the Bihar Legislative Assembly and become the main opposition party. In 1955, the Jharkhand Party submitted a memorandum for the creation of separate state to the States Reorganization Commission, but the demand was not accepted because the region had many languages and tribal groups were in the minority. In 1957 and 1962 Legislative Assembly election, the winning candidates of the party reduced to 31 and 20 in subsequent elections.

Jaipal Singh was disappointed by the declining popularity of his party and rejection of its demand for a separate Jharkhand state. In 1963 the Jharkhand Party merged with Indian National Congress. The merger was quite unpopular within the party ranks, and a number of splinter groups were formed, including the All India Jharkhand Party, the Hul Jharkhand Party, and Veer Birsa Dal.

In 1967, N.E. Horo became an MLA of the Jharkhand Party from Kolibera by election.

In 1971, the Jharkhand Party was reorganized by Bagun Sumrai, who was elected president. Horo became general secretary of the party.

In 1975, N.E. Horo was elected president of the party and Noren Hansda was elected general secretary.

In 1990, N.E. Horo was elected president, working president Lal Ranvijay Nath Sahdeo, Ashok Bhagat General Secretary in byniel conference.

On 8 January 2009, Jharkhand Party candidate Raja Peter defeated sitting Chief Minister of Jharkhand, Shibu Soren by over 9,000 votes in presidency of Anosh Ekka and Shri Ashok Kumar Bhagat-Principal General Secretary.

== Splinter groups ==
The Jharkhand Party was fragmented into several splinter groups, including more than nine during 1967–1972, after its merger into the Indian National Congress.

| Party | Abbr. | Election Symbol | Founded | Founder/Leader | Note |
|---|---|---|---|---|---|
| Jharkhand Party | JKP | | 5 March 1949 | Jaipal Singh Munda | Merged with Indian National Congress (20 June 1963) |
| All India Jharkhand Party (i) | AIJP | | 21 June 1963 | Lal Hari Nath Sahdeo | United with presidency A.K. Lakra (5 April 1966); later split back into three groups |
| All India Jharkhand Party (ii) | AIJP | | 1965 | Paul Dayal | United with presidency A.K. Lakra (5 April 1966); later split back into three groups |
| All India Jharkhand Party (iii) | AIJP | | 1965 | A.K. Lakra | |
| Birsa Seva Dal | BSD | | 1967 | Lalit Kumar Kujur | |
| All India Jharkhand Party (iv) | AIJP | | 28 December 1967 | Ratnakar Naik | |
| Bihar Prant Hul Jharkhand Party | BPHJ | | 28 December 1968 | Justin Richard | |
| Jharkhand Party (Aditya) | JKP(A) | | 1968 | Aditya Kisku | Later renamed to Jharkhand Anushilan Party |
| All India Jharkhand Party (iv) | AIJP | | 19 May 1968 | David Munzni | |
| Jharkhand Party (Horo) | JKP(H) | | 1970 | Niral Enem Horo | |
| All India Jharkhand Party (v) | AIJP | | 1970 | Bagun Sumbrai | |
| Progressive Hul Jharkhand Party | PHJP | | 1972 | | Split of BPHJ |
| Kolhan Raksha Sangh | KRS | | 31 October 1977 | | |
| Jharkhand Mukti Morcha | JMM | | 31 October 1977 | Shibu Soren | |
| Jharkhand Kranti Dal | JKD | | 1980 | | |
| All India Jharkhand Students Union | AJSU | | 22 June 1986 | | |
| Jharkhand Co-ordination Committee | JCC | | 1987 | | |
| Jharkhand Liberation Front | JLF | | 1989 | Salkhan Murmu | |
| Hul Jharkhand Party | HJP | | 1989 | | |
| Jharkhand Party (Naren) | JKP(N) | | 1990 | Naren Hansda | |
| United Jharkhand Party | UJP | | 20 January 1991 | | |
| Hul Jharkhand Kranti Dal | HJKD | | 5 April 1991 | | |
| Chhotanagpur Front | CF | | | | |
| Chhotanagpur Plateau Praja Parishad | CPPP | | | | |
| Krantikari Mukti Morcha | KMM | | | | |

== Electoral performance ==
=== Legislative Assembly election results ===
| Election Year | Party | Seats contested | Seats won | +/- seats | Overall Votes | Percentage of votes | Ref |
|---|---|---|---|---|---|---|---|
| 1952 | JKP | 53 | 32 | – | 765,272 | 8.01 | |
| 1957 | | 70 | 31 | ▼1 | 749,021 | 7.08 | |
| 1962 | | 75 | 20 | ▼11 | 432,643 | 4.39 | |
| 1972 | JKD | 42 | 1 | ▼ | 90,717 | 0.53 | |
| 1977 | JKD | 31 | 2 | | 72,303 | 0.42 | |

== Working committee ==
| S.No. | Name | Designation |
|---|---|---|
| 1. | Anosh Ekka | National President |
| 2. | Ajit Kumar | Executive President |
| 3. | Ashok Kumar Bhagat | Principal General Secretary |
| 4. | Kiran Kumar Aind | Executive President |

== List of presidents ==
| No. | Presidents | Term in Office |
|---|---|---|
| 1. | Jaipal Singh Munda (1903–1970) | 1949–1963 |
Merged into INC, splinted into groups
| 2. | Bagun Sumbrai (1924–2018) | 1971–1975 |
| 3. | Niral Enem Horo (1925–2008) | 1975–2005 |
| 4. | Anosh Ekka (born 1983) | 2005–Incumbent |
