= Ho people =

Ethnic group of India

Ho
Larka kol
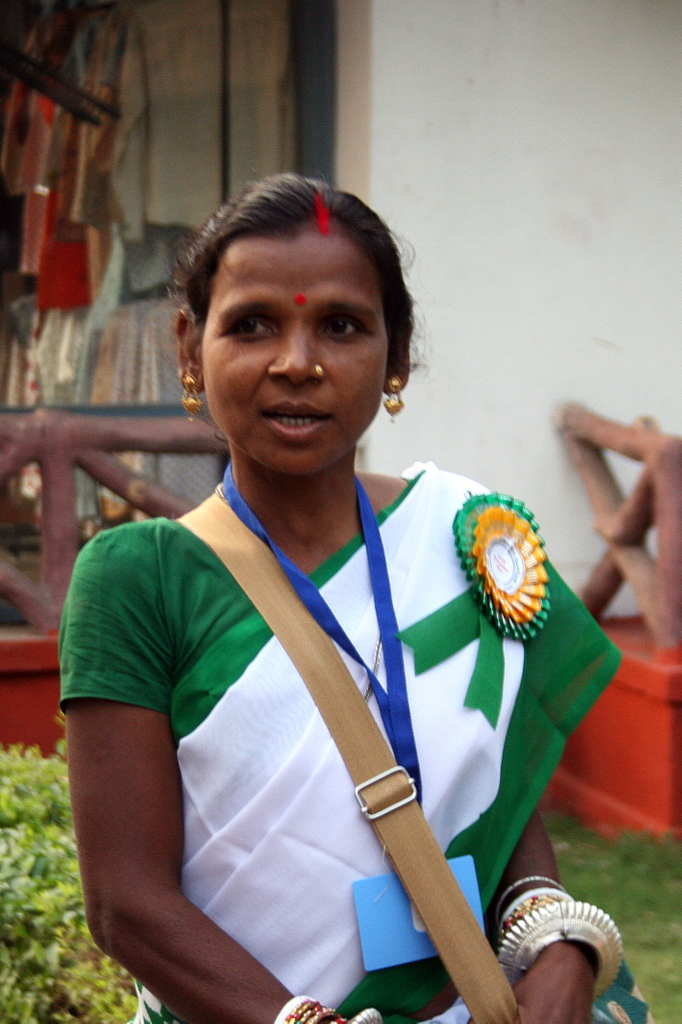
- Ho tribe woman in traditional attire.

Total population
- c. 1.7 million (Note: The total population of Ho people in India is approximately 1.7 million (1,733,355), comprising 1,033,095 Ho individuals from Bihar, West Bengal, Jharkhand, and Odisha; 75,251 Kol individuals from Bihar, Jharkhand, and Odisha; and 625,009 Kolha individuals from Odisha.) (2011)

Regions with significant populations
- India
- Jharkhand: 928,289
- Odisha: 705,618
- West Bengal: 23,483
- Bihar: 715

Languages
- Ho language

Religion
- Sarnaism; Hinduism; Christianity

Related ethnic groups
- Mundas; Kharias; Juangs; Santals; Bhumijs
- Odisha population figures include Kol, Kolah & Larko-Kol who although listed as a separate Scheduled Tribe, are another name for the Hos.

The Ho people are an Austroasiatic Munda ethnic group of India. They are mostly concentrated in the Kolhan region of Jharkhand and northern Odisha where they constitute around 10.7% and 7.3% of the total Scheduled Tribe population respectively, as of 2011. With a population of approximately 700,000 in the state in 2001, the Ho are the fourth most numerous Scheduled tribe in Jharkhand after the Santals, Kurukhs, and Mundas. The Ho also inhabit adjacent areas in the neighbouring states of Odisha, West Bengal and Bihar, bringing the total to 806,921, as of 2001. They also live in Bangladesh and Nepal.

According to Ethnologue, the total number of people speaking the Ho language was 1,040,000 as of 2001. Similar to other Austroasiatic groups in the area, the Ho report varying degrees of multilingualism, also using Hindi and English.

The majority of the Ho are involved in agriculture, either as land owners or labourers, while others are engaged in mining. Compared to the rest of India, the Ho have a low literacy rate and a low rate of school enrolment. The government of Jharkhand has recently approved measures to help increase enrolment and literacy among children.

== Etymology ==
The term "Ho" originates from the Ho language, where "hō" translates to "human". The name encompasses both their ethnic identity and language, closely linked to Mundari within the Austroasiatic language family. In Odisha, certain segments of the Ho tribe, such as Kol, Kolha, and Kolah are officially recognised as distinct groups. These names are derived from the colonial exonym Kol, a term widely used for tribal communities across northern India, and from blends of exonyms and endonyms such as Hoo, Hoṛo, and Hoṛoko, all signifying "human" or "human being" in their language. They were also historically referred to as Larka Kol, reflecting their rebellious nature, composed of Larka (meaning "fighter" in the Munda language) and the exonym Kol.

== History ==
=== Prehistory ===
Linguistic studies suggest that the Austroasiatic homeland was in Southeast Asia and Austroasiatic languages arrived on the coast of Odisha from Southeast Asia about 4000–3500 years ago. The Austroasiatic speaker spread from Southeast Asia and mixed extensively with local Indian populations.

According to historian Ram Sharan Sharma in his book India's Ancient Past mentioned that, many Austroasiatic, Dravidian, and non-Sanskrit terms occur in the Vedic texts ascribed to 1500-500 BC. They indicate ideas, institutions, products, and settlements associated with peninsular and non-Vedic India. The people of this area spoke the proto-Munda language. Several terms in the Indo-Aryan languages that signify the use of cotton, navigation, digging, stick, etc. have been traced to the Munda languages by linguists. There are many Munda pockets in Chota Nagpur Plateau, in which the remnants of Munda culture are strong. It is held that changes in the phonetics and vocabulary of the Vedic language can be explained as much on the basis of the Dravidian influence as that of the Munda.

=== Medieval to modern history ===
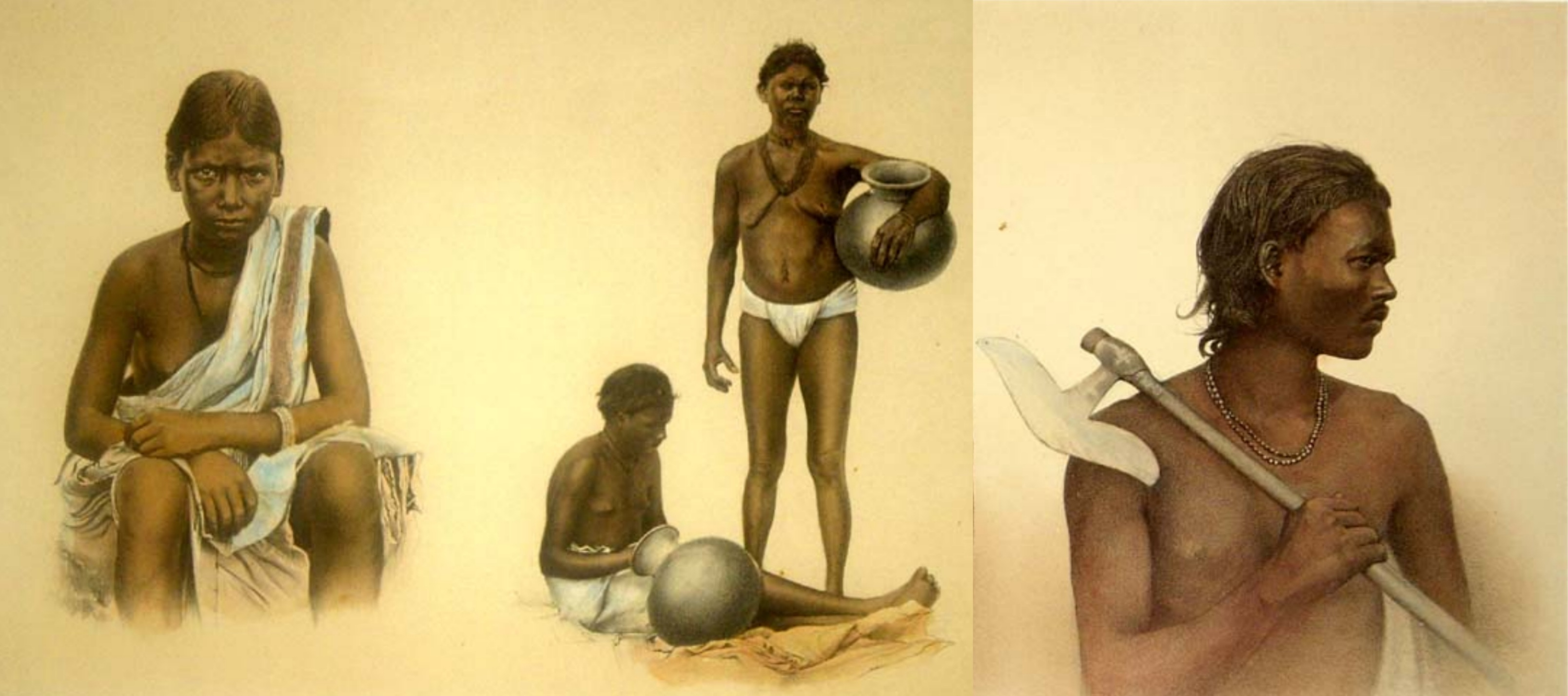
Dalton's painting of Ho man and woman in 1872

Starting from the period between the 9th and 12th centuries, copper was smelted in many parts of old Singhbhum district. It is believed that many immigrants entered Singhbhum from Manbhum in the 14th century or earlier. When the Hos entered old Singhbhum, they overcame the Bhuiyas by 17th century, who were then inhabitants of the forest country. In the latter half of the eighteenth century, the Hos fought several wars against the Rajas of the Chota Nagpur States and Mayurbhanj to retain their independence. Although the area was formally claimed to be a part of the Mughal Empire, neither the Mughals nor the Marathas, who were active in the surrounding areas during the decline of the Mughals, ventured into the area. As far as is known, the Muslims left them alone and the Ho enjoyed their autonomy.

In 1765, Chota Nagpur was ceded to the British East India Company as part of Bengal, Bihar, and Orissa Provinces. The Raja of Singhbhum (de facto Porahat estate) asked the British Resident at Midnapore for protection in 1767, but it was not until 1820 that he acknowledged himself as a feudatory of the British. The restless Hos broke the agreement soon and took part in a fierce rebellion of 1831–33, called the Kol uprising, along with the Mundas. The immediate cause of the Kol uprising was the disposition of Mankis and extraction of taxes by thikadars (literally meaning contractors) or farmers of rent. The Hos and Mundas were joined by the Kurukh and the houses of many thikedars, landlords were burnt and a number of people were killed. They also plundered, killed and destroyed villages Hindus. It compelled the British to recognise the need for a thorough subjugation of the Hos. The uprising was suppressed with a good deal of trouble by several hundred British troops. While local troops quelled the uprising, another group under Colonel Richards entered Singhbhum in November 1836. Within three months all the ringleaders surrendered. Subsequently the "Kolhan Government Estate" was formed by Wilkinson in 1937, composing Ho concentrated areas. In 1857, the Raja of Porahat rose in rebellion and a sizeable section of the Hos joined in the revolt. Troops were sent who put an end to the disturbances by 1859.

== Language ==
Ho people speak the Ho language, an Austroasiatic language closely related to Mundari and more distantly related to languages of Southeast Asia such as Khmer and Mon. The Austroasiatic languages of India, including Ho, are inflected fusional languages unlike their distant relatives in Southeast Asia which are analytic languages. This difference in typology is due to extensive language contact with the unrelated Indo-Aryan and Dravidian languages. The phonology of Ho has also been influenced by the nearby unrelated languages. There are at least three dialects of Ho: Lohara, Chaibasa and Thakurmunda. All dialects are mutually intelligible with approximately 92% of all Ho speakers able to understand a narrative discourse in both Chaibasa and Thakurmunda dialects. The most divergent dialects are in the extreme south and east of Ho territory.

While fewer than five per cent of Ho speakers are literate in the language, Ho is typically written in Devanagari, Latin, scripts. A native alphabet, called Warang Citi and invented by Lako Bodra in the 20th century, also exists.

== Culture ==
Gõan Bonga (Cattle Pen Sacrifice) performed by desauli, the family head in Keshpada, Mayurbhanj, India

Two Dama and Dumaṅ players playing a tune from Mage Porob and explaining making of the instruments in Ho language

Ho village life revolves around five main porob or festivals. The most important festival, Mage Parab, takes place in the late winter month of Magha and marks the completion of the agricultural cycle. It is a week-long celebration held to honour Singbonga, the creator god. Other lesser bonga (spirits) are also honoured throughout the week. Baa Porob, the festival of flowers held in mid-spring, celebrates the yearly blossoming of the sacred Sal trees. Sohrai or Gaumára is the most important agricultural festival, the date of which usually coincides with the nationwide festivities in the fall. It is a village wide celebration with music and dancing held in honour of the cattle used in cultivation. During the ceremonies, the cows are painted with a flour and dye mix, anointed with oil and prayed over after a black chicken is sacrificed to an image of the cattle bonga. Baba Hermúṭu is the ceremonial first sowing. The date is set each year in the early spring by the diuri or priest, who also officiates the three-day ceremony by praying and commencing his first sowing of the year. Jomnama Porob is held in late fall before the first harvest is eaten to thank the spirits for a trouble-free harvest.

Dance is important to Adivasi culture in general and for the Ho, it is more than simply a means of entertainment. Their songs are generally accompanied by dances which change with the seasons. Songs and distinctively choreographed dance are integral parts of Ho culture and art, as well as important parts of their traditional festivals, especially Mage Parab. Most villages have a dedicated dancing ground, called akhra, usually consisting of a cleared space of hard ground under a spreading tree. Dances are organised on a staggered basis in the villages so that other villagers can participate. Traditional Ho music incorporates native instruments including a Dama (drum), Dumaṅ (barrel drum), and the Rutu (flute).

The Ho people brew rice wine, called Ḍiaṅ.

== Religion ==
Religion among 1.7 million Ho people of Bihar, Jharkhand, Odisha, and West Bengal (2011 census)
1. Sarnaism (52.8%)
2. Hinduism (44.5%)
3. Christianity (1.90%)
4. Islam (0.10%)
5. not stated (0.20%)
6. Other (0.50%)

In the 2001 national census, 91% of the Hos of Jharkhand declared that they professed "other religions and persuations", meaning that they do not consider themselves to belong to any of the major religious groups and follow their indigenous religious systems called "Sarna" or Sarnaism. Also known as sarna dhorom ("religion of the holy woods"), this religion plays an important part in the life of adivasi. Their beliefs in gods, goddesses and spirits are ingrained in them from childhood. The religion of the Hos resembles, to a great extent that of Santhals, Oraons, Mundas, and other tribal people in the region. All religious rituals are performed by a village priest known as a deuri. However, he is not required to propitiate malevolent spirits or deities. The spirit doctor deowa takes care of this.

=== Position of women ===
Houlton writes, "I do not want to give the impression, by mentioning occasional divergences from the straight and narrow path, that aboriginals are immoral. On the contrary, their standards of post-marital morality and fidelity are probably a good deal higher than in some races that claim to be more civilised. The status of women is high. Wives are partners and companions to their husbands. It is even whispered that hen-pecked husbands are not uncommon among the tribesmen."

There is a system of payment of bride-price amongst the Hos. The bride-price is often a status symbol and in modern times it remains not more than 101-1001 rupees. As a result, many Ho girls remain unmarried till advanced age. Among the total Ho population, females outnumber the males.

== Economy ==
A Ho farmer sharing his farming experience

Almost half the population is engaged in cultivation and another one third also work as land-less agricultural labourers. The Hos, along with Santals, Oraons and Mundas, are comparatively more advanced, and have taken to settled cultivation as their mode of life.

The discovery of iron ore in Ho territory opened the way for the first iron ore mine in India at Pansira Buru in 1901. Over the years iron ore mining spread out in the area. Many Hos are engaged in mining work but that does not add up to any sizeable percentage. However, small, well planned mining towns dotting the territory have brought the Ho people in close touch with the good and bad aspects of urbanisation. Some of the prominent mining towns in the area are Chiria, Gua, Noamundi and Kiriburu.

== Forests ==
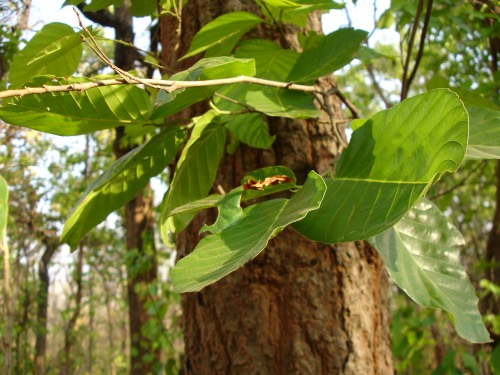
Sal tree

Sal (Shorea robusta) is the most important tree in the area and it seems to have a preference for the rocky soil there. Although sal is a deciduous tree and sheds its leaves in early summer, the forest undergrowth is generally evergreen, which has such trees as mangoes, jamun, jackfruit, and piar. Other important trees are mahua, kusum, tilai, harin hara (Armossa rohitulea), gular (Fiscus glomerata), asan. The Singhbhum forests are best in the Kolhan area in the south-west of the district. The lives of Ho people have long been intertwined with sal forests and there is a strong resentment against the efforts of timber merchants to replace sal forests with teak plantations.

The reserved forests are the haunt of many animals. Wild elephants are common in Saranda (literally meaning seven hundred hills) and Porahat forests. Herds of sambar and chital roam about the forests. Bison is still found (locally extinct when a study was undertaken in 2005 by Kisor Chaudhuri FRGS). Tigers were never numerous but they are there (locally extinct when a study was undertaken in 2005 by Kisor Chaudhuri FRGS). Leopards are more common. The Hos are keen hunters and have practically exterminated game in Kolhan. They organise great battues, in which thousands of people join. They beat their drums in a huge circle, and gradually close in over hills and across forests, driving the wild animals on to a central point, on to which lines of hunters converge until the animals are surrounded and slaughtered.

== Literacy ==
As per the 2011 census, the literacy rate for the Ho population was around 44.7% for all and 33.1% for women, much lower than the Jharkhand averages of 66.4% for all and 55.4% for women.

Ho community Updates up to 2025

In order to help increase the literacy rates, the government announced in 2016 that it had designed text books to teach Hindi and mathematics in Ho. In 2017 those textbooks were made available on the central government's e-library platform. In a 2016 effort to help promote tribal languages Tata Steel, a private company, began teaching the Ho language on weekends to drop-out schoolgirls at a "camp school" in Naomundi. As of November 2016, 100 girls were enrolled in the camp school. The company has also run private Ho language centres in East Singhbhum, West Singhbhum and Seraikela-Kharsawan districts since 2011. Approximately 6000 people have undergone Ho language and Warang Chiti script training in these centres. In 2017 the government of Jharkhand announced it would soon begin teaching five- and six-year-old primary school students in their local language in order to help reduce the high drop-out rate. Among the Hos, 19.7% have completed schooling and 3.1% are graduates. The percentage of school-going children in the age group 5 –14 years was 37.6.

== Notable people ==
- Pradeep Kumar Balmuchu - Indian politician and a former member of the 14th Lok Sabha
- Debendranath Champia - Indian politician and a former member of the Bihar constituency assembly
- Lipika Singh Darai - Indian filmmaker and film director
- Laxman Giluwa - Indian politician and the president of the Jharkhand unit of Bhartiya Janta Party
- Geeta Koda - Indian politician and member of Indian National Congress
- Madhu Koda - former Chief Minister of Jharkhand
- Chitrasen Sinku - Indian politician and a member of the Eleventh Lok Sabha.
- Janum Singh Soy - Indian scholar and Padma Shri awardee
- Bagun Sumbrai - Indian politician and a former member of the 14th Lok Sabha

== See also ==
- Tribes of Jharkhand
