= Munda people =

Ethnic group of India, Bangladesh and Nepal

Hoṛoko, Hoṛo
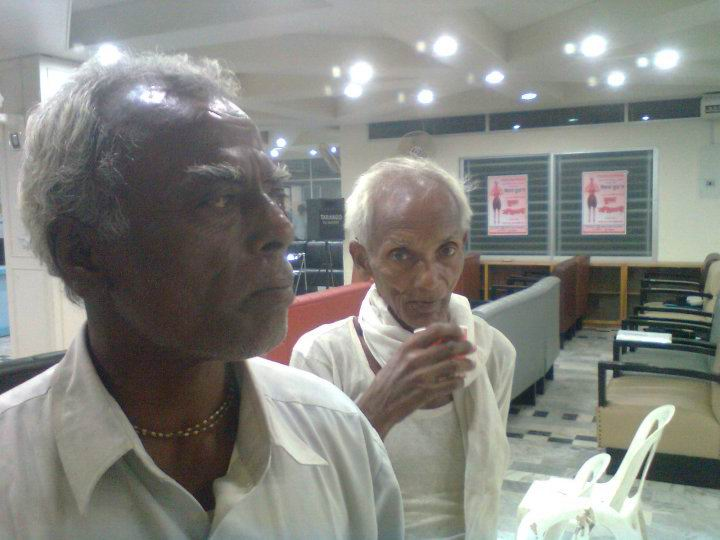
- Munda men, Dinajpur District, Bangladesh

Total population
- c. 2.29 million

Regions with significant populations
- India; Bangladesh; Nepal
- India: 2,228,661 (2011)
- Jharkhand: 1,229,221
- Odisha: 584,346
- West Bengal: 366,386
- Assam: 149,851 (1921)
- Chhattisgarh: 15,095
- Tripura: 14,544
- Bihar: 14,028
- Madhya Pradesh: 5,041
- Bangladesh: 60,191 (2021)
- Nepal: 2,350 (2011)

Languages
- Mundari: Panchpargania • Sadri • Odia • Bengali • Hindi

Religion
- Hinduism • Sarnaism • Christianity • Islam

Related ethnic groups
- Munda peoples: Bhumijs; Ho; Kharias; Juangs; Santhals

𞓧𞓟𞓨𞓜𞓕 Munda
- Person: 𞓞𞓐𞓣𞓐 (Hoṛo)
- People: 𞓞𞓐𞓣𞓐𞓢𞓐 (Hoṛoko)
- Language: Mundari
- Country: India; Bangladesh; Nepal

The Munda people are an Austroasiatic-speaking ethnic group of the Indian subcontinent. They speak Mundari as their native language, which belongs to the Munda subgroup of Austroasiatic languages. The Munda are found mainly concentrated in the south and East Chhotanagpur Plateau region of Jharkhand, Odisha and West Bengal. The Munda also reside in adjacent areas of Madhya Pradesh as well as in portions of Bangladesh, Nepal, and the Indian state of Tripura. They are one of India's largest scheduled tribes. Munda people in Tripura are also known as Mura. In the Kolhan region of Jharkhand the Munda people are often called Tamadia by other communities.

== Overview ==
=== Etymology ===
Munda means headman of a village in the Munda-Manki system to govern villages in South-east Chotanagpur. They call themselves horoko or ho ko, which means "men".

Robert Parkin notes that the term "Munda" did not belong to the Austroasiatic lexis and is of Sanskrit origin. According to R. R. Prasad, the name "Munde" is a Ho word that means "headman". It is an honorific name given by Hindus, and hence became a tribal name. According to Standing (1976), it was under British rule that the term Munda started to be used for the tribal group.

=== Geographic distribution ===
Distribution of Munda people

The Munda primarily inhabit the eastern states of Jharkhand, West Bengal, and Odisha, specifically in the Khunti, Ranchi, Simdega, Paschim Singhbhum, Gumla, Purbi Singhbhum, and Ramghar districts of Jharkhand; the Sundargarh and Sambalpur districts of Odisha; and the Jalpaiguri, Paschim Medinipur, and North 24 Parganas districts of West Bengal. They are also sporadically distributed in the neighbouring states of Chhattisgarh and Bihar. Additionally, they live in the northeastern states of Assam, Tripura, and Mizoram, largely in the tea valleys of Assam, where they migrated to work as tea garden workers during colonial India. Apart from India, they also reside in neighbouring countries such as Bangladesh and Nepal.

== History ==
According to linguist Paul Sidwell, Munda languages arrived on the coast of Odisha from Southeast Asia approximately 4,000 to 3,500 years ago (c. 2000 – c. 1500 BCE). The Munda people are genetically closely related to Mah Meri and Temuan people of Malaysia.

According to historian R. S. Sharma, tribals who spoke the Munda language occupied the eastern region of ancient India. Many Munda terms occur in Vedic texts that were written between 1500 BCE and 500 BCE. Their presence in texts compiled in the upper Gangetic basin late in that period suggests that Munda speakers were there at the time. According to Barbara A. West, the Mundas claim origin in Uttar Pradesh, and a steady flow eastward in history as other groups moved into their original homeland; she suggests that they inhabited a "much larger territory" in ancient India. Recent studies suggest that Munda languages spread as far as Eastern Uttar Pradesh but not beyond that, and impacted Eastern Indo-Aryan languages, as some groups such as Musahar have Munda genetic lineage. The claim of a Munda presence in the Upper Gangetic plain has no linguistic or genetic basis.

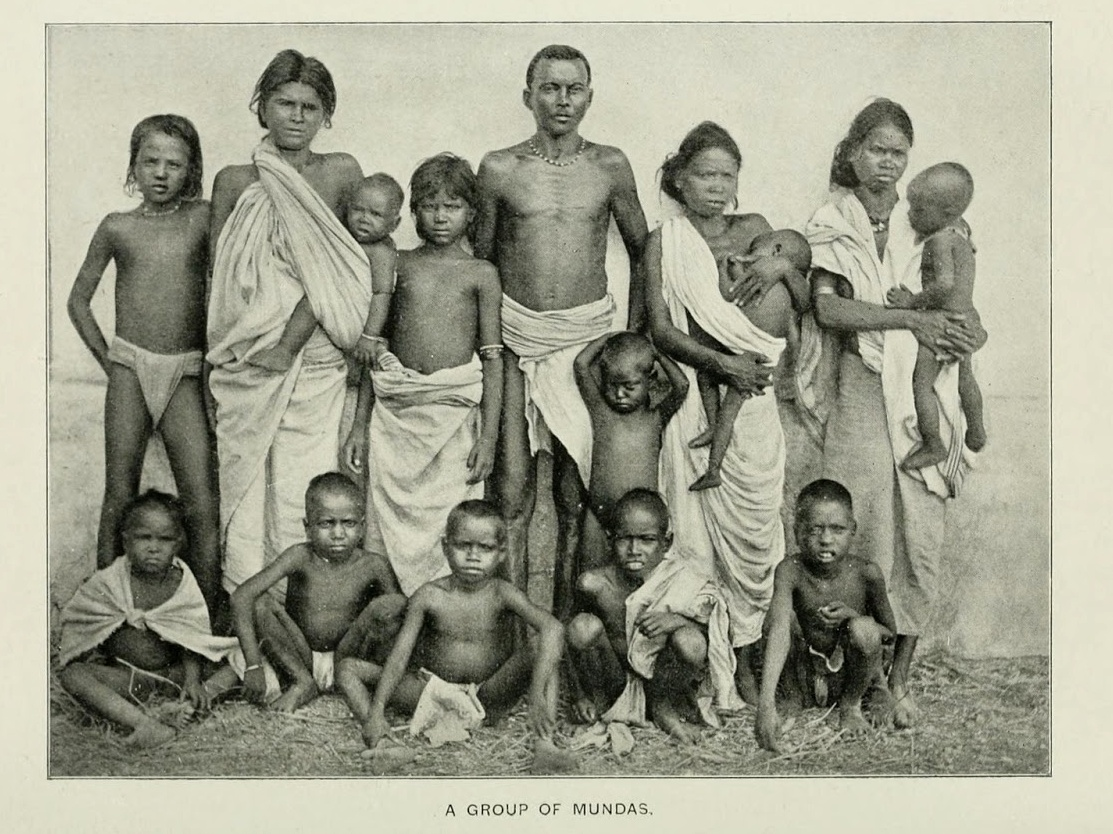
1903 Group photo of Mundas in Chota Nagpur.

In the late 1800s, during the British Raj, the Mundas were forced to pay rents and work as bonded labourers to the zamindars. During the Kol uprising in 1823–1833, some Manki Munda revolted due to their disposition and attacked Thikedars, other Mankis, plundered and destroyed villages. This insurgency was suppressed by Thomas Wilkinson. During the 19th century, Munda freedom fighter Birsa Munda began the protest marches calling for non-payment of rents and remission of forest dues. He led guerrilla warfare to uproot the British Raj and establish Munda Raj. He was caught by Company forces, along with his supporters, and died in jail. He is still revered in Jharkhand.

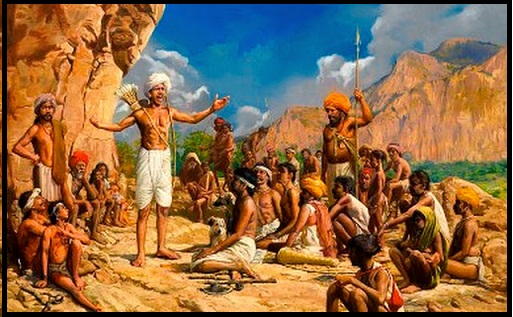
Illustration of Munda rebellion in 1800s

Nomadic hunters in the India tribal belt, they became farmers and some were employed in basketwork. With the listing of the Munda people as Scheduled Tribes, many are employed in various governmental organisations (particularly Indian Railways).

== Social structure ==
=== Kinship patterns ===
Munda are divided into a number of exogamous clans. Clans among Mundas are known as Killi, which is similar to Sanskrit word Kula. Munda are patrilineal, and clan name descends father to son. According to tradition, people of the same clan are descendants of the same forefather. Clans among Mundas are of totemic origin. Some clans are:

- Baa (a fish)
- Baba (rice)
- Bodra
- Balamchu (fish net)
- Barla
- Bhengra (horse)
- Bhutkumar
- Bhuswar (bird)
- Bukru (a bird)
- Bulung (salt)
- Dang, Dungdung (a fish)
- Gudia, Hans (swan)
- Hemrom/Hembram (a tree)
- Herenz (a specific Bird)
- Horo (turtle)
- Hundar (hyena)
- Jojo (tamarind)
- Kauwa (crow)
- Kerketta (a bird)
- Kula (tiger)
- Nil (bull)
- Mus (mouse)
- Nag (cobra)
- Oreya (bammboo basket)
- Pandu (cobra)
- Purty
- Runda (wild cat)
- Sandil (Full moon)
- Sanga (a type of root)
- Surin/Soren/Soreng (a bird)
- Tiru (a bird)
- Tuti (a type of grain)
- Topno (red ants)
- Kongari (white crow)

=== Administrative system ===
Munda-Manki governing system was prevalent in Kolhan region of Jharkhand. Munda govern their villages by Munda-Manki system. Head of village is called Munda, informant of village is called Dakuwa, village priest is called Pahaan, assistant of Pahaan is called Pujhar, head of 15 to 20 villages is called Manki, assistant of Manki is called Tahshildar, which collected taxes. The priest "Deori" is also prevalent among Hos, Bhumij, Bhuyan, Sounti, Khonds tribe of Odisha and Chutia people of Assam. (Note: "All these Bodo tribes had their own respective priests called Deoris".) In Chotanagpur division, Munda have adopted Pahan as their village priest.

== Culture and tradition ==
=== Festival ===
Involved in agriculture, the Munda people celebrate the seasonal festivals of Mage Parab, Phagu, Karam, Baha parab, Sarhul and Sohrai. Some seasonal festivals have coincided with religious festivals, but their original meaning remains. Their deity is Singbonga.

=== Music ===
They have many folk songs, dances, tales and traditional musical instruments. Both sexes participate in dances at social events and festivals. The naqareh is a principal musical instrument. Munda refer to their dance and song as durang and susun respectively. Some folk dances of the Munda are Jadur, Karam Susun and Mage Susun. Mundari music is similar to the music of Sadan. Mundari Mage song (winter) rhythm is similar to the Nagpuri Fagua song (winter, spring) rhythm.

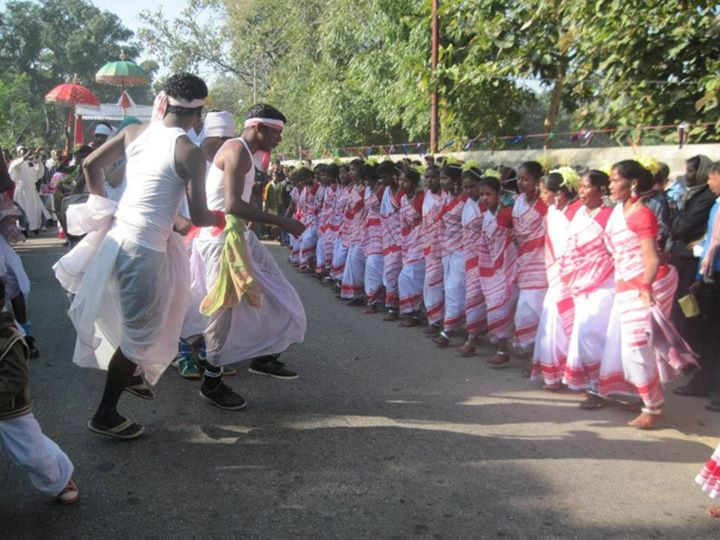
Mundari dance

A Mundari Jadur folk dance song

=== Rituals ===
The Munda people have elaborate rituals to celebrate birth, death, engagement and marriage.

Munda practice clan exogamy and tribal endogamy. Monogamy is the norm. Bride price is prevalent. Marriage ceremony starts with Sagai and ends with Bidai. Munda enjoy this occasion with feast, drinks and dance. According to Sarat Chandra Roy, Sindurdaan ceremony and turmeric use in marriage clearly reflect Hindu elements borrowed into Munda tradition.

Munda people of Jharkhand also follow the age old tradition of Patthalgari, i.e., stone erection, in which the tribal community residing in the village buries a large inverted U-shaped dressed headstone on the head side of a grave or at the entrance to the village, in which is inscribed the family tree of the dead persons. There are some other types of patthalgari also:

- Horadiri - It is the stone in which family tree is written.
- Chalpadiri or Saasandiri - It is the stone in remarking boundary of any village and its limits.
- Magodiri - This is the headstone of a social criminal who committed polygamy or unsocial marriage.
- Ziddiri - This is the stone placed over burial of placenta and dried navel part of a newborn.

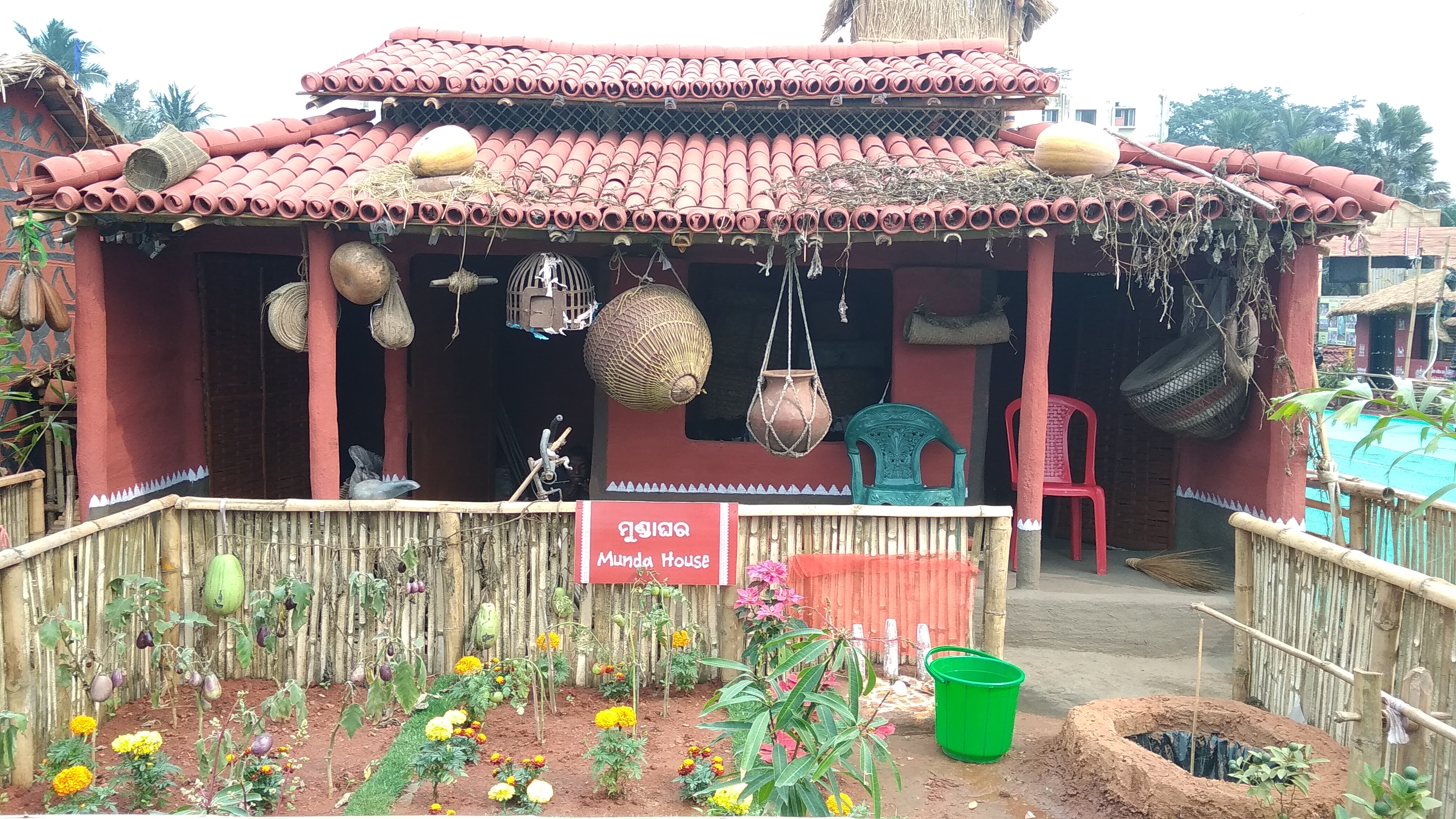
Munda House at "State Tribal Fair- 2020", Bhubaneswar

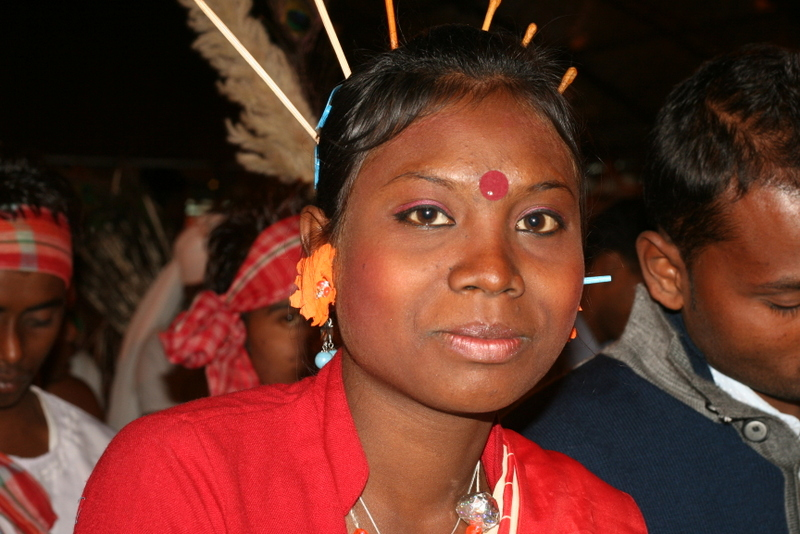
Munda Lady

== Literature and studies ==
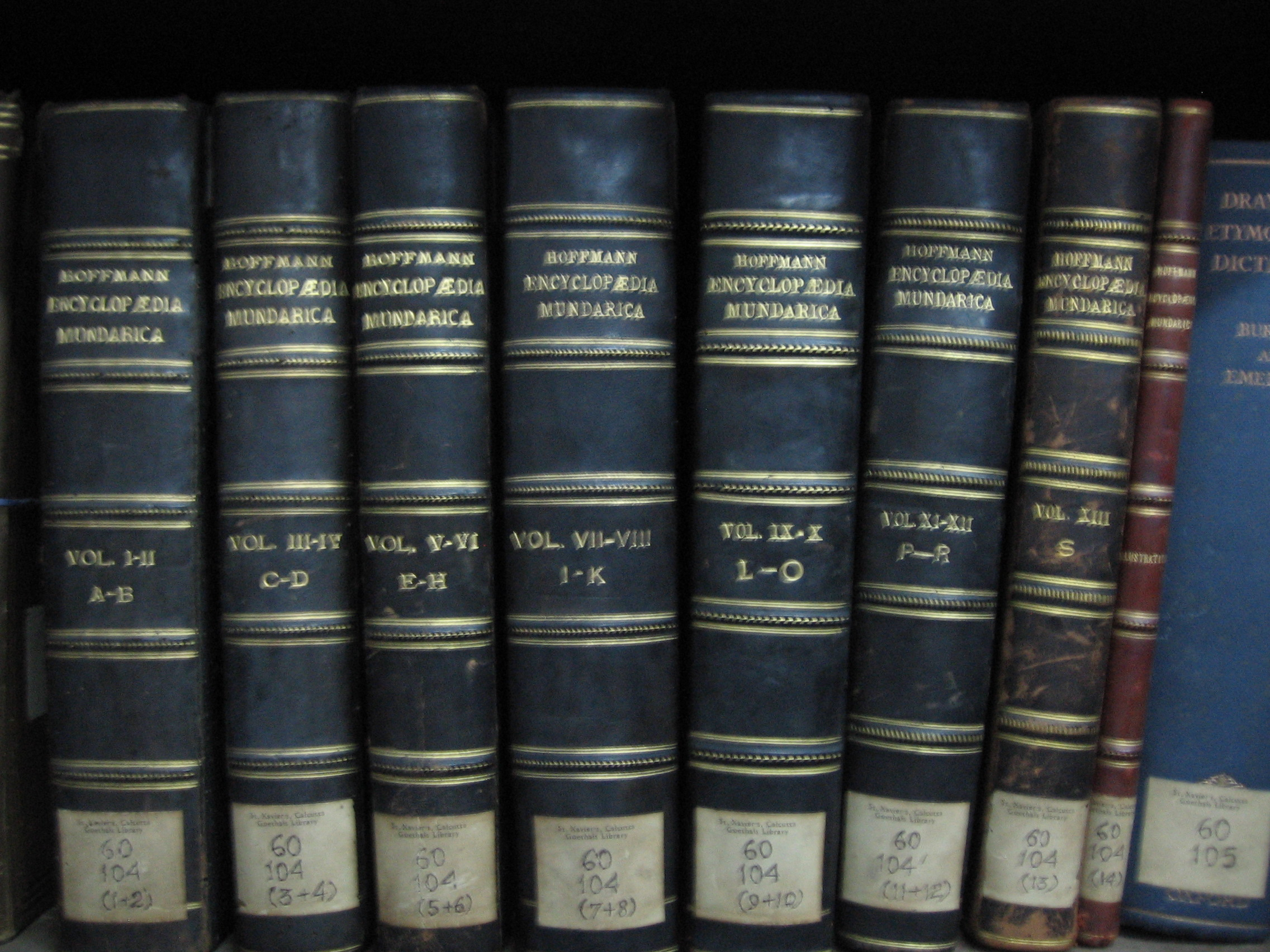
Part of John-Baptist Hoffmann's 15-volume Encyclopaedia Mundarica

Jesuit priest John-Baptist Hoffmann (1857–1928) studied the language, customs, religion and life of the Munda people, publishing the first Mundari language grammar in 1903. With the help of Menas Orea, Hoffmann published the 15-volume Encyclopaedia Mundarica. The first edition was published posthumously in 1937, and a third edition was published in 1976. The Mundas and Their Country, by S. C. Roy, was published in 1912. Adidharam (Hindi:आदि धर्म) by Ram Dayal Munda and Ratan Singh Manki, in Mundari with a Hindi translation, describes Munda rituals and customs.

Title	Author(s)	Year / Edition	Focus / What It Covers	Significance
Encyclopaedia Mundarica	John Baptist Hoffmann & Arthur Van Emelen	Volumes published between ~1924-1950	A multi-volume reference work describing the language, culture, customs, material culture of the Mundas.	One of the most comprehensive traditional sources in English on Munda culture.
The Mundas and Their Country	S. C. Roy	1912 (original)	Ethnographic / geographical study of the Munda people and their lands.	Important early work documenting Munda social and economic life during British colonial period.
Musical Culture of the Munda Tribe	Sem Topno	(year not always indicated)	Study of music and dance among the Munda, with song texts (in original + English translation), relation to life-cycle, cosmology etc.	Fills a gap in literature by focusing on artistic expressions; useful for culture & anthropology.
Cultural Study of Oraon and Munda Tribes	Niranjan Mahawar	2019 (Hardcover ed.)	Comparative cultural study of the two tribes: lifestyle, performing arts, cultural change etc.	Useful for understanding similarities/differences with neighbouring tribes; more recent scholarship.
The Religious History of Munda and Oraon Tribes	Diwakar Minz	2017	Traces beliefs, customs, origin, and changes over time among Munda & Oraon tribes.	Helps understand religious dimension historically and its evolution.
The Legend of Birsa Munda	(by Tuhin A. Sinha)	English edition (2021)	Narrative / biographical work about Birsa Munda, his life, struggle, resistance.	Widely accessible work; useful for popular understanding and for those less familiar with academic texts.
The Life and Times of Jaipal Singh Munda	Santosh Kiro	2018	Biography of Jaipal Singh Munda, notable leader, role in tribal politics, sporting and other contributions.	Adds dimension of modern political history, leadership, and identity.

== Social issues ==
=== Economic condition ===
In a 2016 research paper on subsistence strategies of Mundas in a village of Sunderbans in West Bengal, it was found that many people migrate out of their residences because of poor economic conditions and landlessness. This rural to urban migration has followed a greater trend within India. Men and women engage in forest product collection, cultivation, small business and agricultural as well as non-agricultural jobs. A person or a family may be engaged in multiple occupations, often undertaking risky visits to the forests and rivers. It was also found that younger generation preferred to engage as migrant workers outside the village and often outside the district and the state.

== Notable people ==
- Dayamani Barla (active 2004–2013), journalist
- John Barla, politician
- Nikhil Barla, Indian footballer
- Puna Bhengra, politician
- Niral Enem Horo, politician
- Sushila Kerketta, politician
- Amrit Lugun (born 1962), ambassador to Greece, South Asian Association for Regional Cooperation director
- Anuj Lugun (born 1986), poet who received the 2011 Bharat Bhushan Agarwal Award
- Munmun Lugun, football player
- Dulal Manki, folk singer
- Arjun Munda (born 1968), politician
- Birsa Munda (1875–1900), freedom fighter, religious leader
- Jaipal Singh Munda (1903–1970), politician, hockey player
- Joseph Munda, politician
- Kariya Munda (born 1936), politician
- Laxman Munda, politician
- Nilkanth Singh Munda (born 1968), politician
- Nirmal Munda, ex-army, social activist and politician
- Prakash Munda, first tribal cricketer from Jharkhand
- Ram Dayal Munda (1939–2011), scholar in languages & folklore
- Sukra Munda (active 2016 to 2020), politician
- Tulasi Munda (born 1947), social activist
- Sushila Samad (1906–1960), poet
- Rohidas Singh Nag (1934–2012), creator of "Mundari Bani" script
- Masira Surin, hockey player
- Frida Topno, politician
- Manohar Topno, hockey player
- Rajeev Topno (born 1974), private secretary to the prime minister of India, senior advisor to the executive director at World Bank

== See also ==
- Christianity in Jharkhand
- Korku people
- Munda peoples
- Kolarian
