= Lugun =

Lugun (Hindi: लुगुन) is an Indian surname. Notable people with the surname include:

- Amrit Lugun (born 1974), Indian Ambassador
- Anuj Lugun (born 1986), Indian poet and author
- Munmun Lugun (born 1993), Indian footballer
