= Singbonga =

Deity of the Ho, Bhumij, Santal, Munda, Asur and Birhor tribes

- God of creation and preservation
- Affiliation: Sarna Dharam
- Mantra: Sirma redo Singbonga, Singbongae elang tana....
- Symbol: The Sun
- Festivals: Sarhul, Sohrai, Mage Parab, etc.

Singbonga is a deity worshipped primarily by the tribal communities in the Indian state of Jharkhand and the neighboring regions of West Bengal, Odisha, and Bihar. Revered as the supreme god by the Ho, Munda, Bhumij, and Santhal tribes, Singbonga represents the sun god and is associated with light, life, and fertility. His worship is an integral part of the tribal religious practices and rituals, often celebrated with grandeur and devotion.

In some tribal communities, a sacred tree or a stone may serve as his symbol, marking places of worship or ritual importance.

== Etymology ==
The name Singbonga is derived from two words: Sing meaning "sun" and Bonga meaning "god" or "deity" in the Munda languages. The term symbolizes the Sun God, regarded as a life-giving force that controls various aspects of nature, agriculture, and wellbeing.

== Description ==
Singbonga is believed to be the creator of the universe and is seen as a powerful force that governs both the natural and spiritual worlds. According to tribal mythology, Singbonga created the world and all its inhabitants. He is often depicted as a benevolent and just god who sustains the balance of nature. The sun, being a vital aspect of life, is his earthly manifestation. As a protector of crops, animals, and people, Singbonga is called upon for blessings of good harvests, health, and prosperity.
