= Chiria =

- Census town
- Location in Jharkhand, India Chiria (India)
- Coordinates: 22.3°N 85.27°E
- Country: India
- State: Jharkhand
- District: Pashchimi Singhbhum
- Elevation: 479 m (1,572 ft)

Population (2011)
  - Total: 4,178

Languages
  - Official: Hindi, Ho, Santali
- Time zone: UTC+5:30 (IST)
- Vehicle registration: JH-06

Chiria is a census town in Pashchimi Singhbhum district in the state of Jharkhand, India.

== Geography ==
Chiria is located at 22.3°N 85.27°E. It has an average elevation of 479 metres (1571 feet).

== Demographics ==
As of 2011 India census, Chiria had a population of 4,178. Males constitute 51% of the population and females 49%. Chiria has an average literacy rate of 57%, lower than the national average of 59.5%; with male literacy of 68% and female literacy of 45%. 15% of the population is under 6 years of age. The local inhabitants are known as Ho people.

== Economy ==
Iron ore mining was started at Chiria in 1901. India's largest iron ore mine with reserves of 2 billion tonnes of iron ore is located here. The mine is operated by Steel Authority of India Limited. India's first iron ore mine was at Pansira Buru and then shifted to Budha Buru in Chiria. Iron ore deposits in the area were discovered by R. Soubolle.
