= Warang Citi (Unicode block) =

- Range: U+118A0..U+118FF (96 code points)
- Plane: SMP
- Scripts: Warang Citi
- Major alphabets: Warang Citi (Varang Kshiti)
- Assigned: 84 code points
- Unused: 12 reserved code points

Unicode Version History
- 7.0 (2014): 84 (+84)

Unicode documentation
- Code chart ∣ Web page

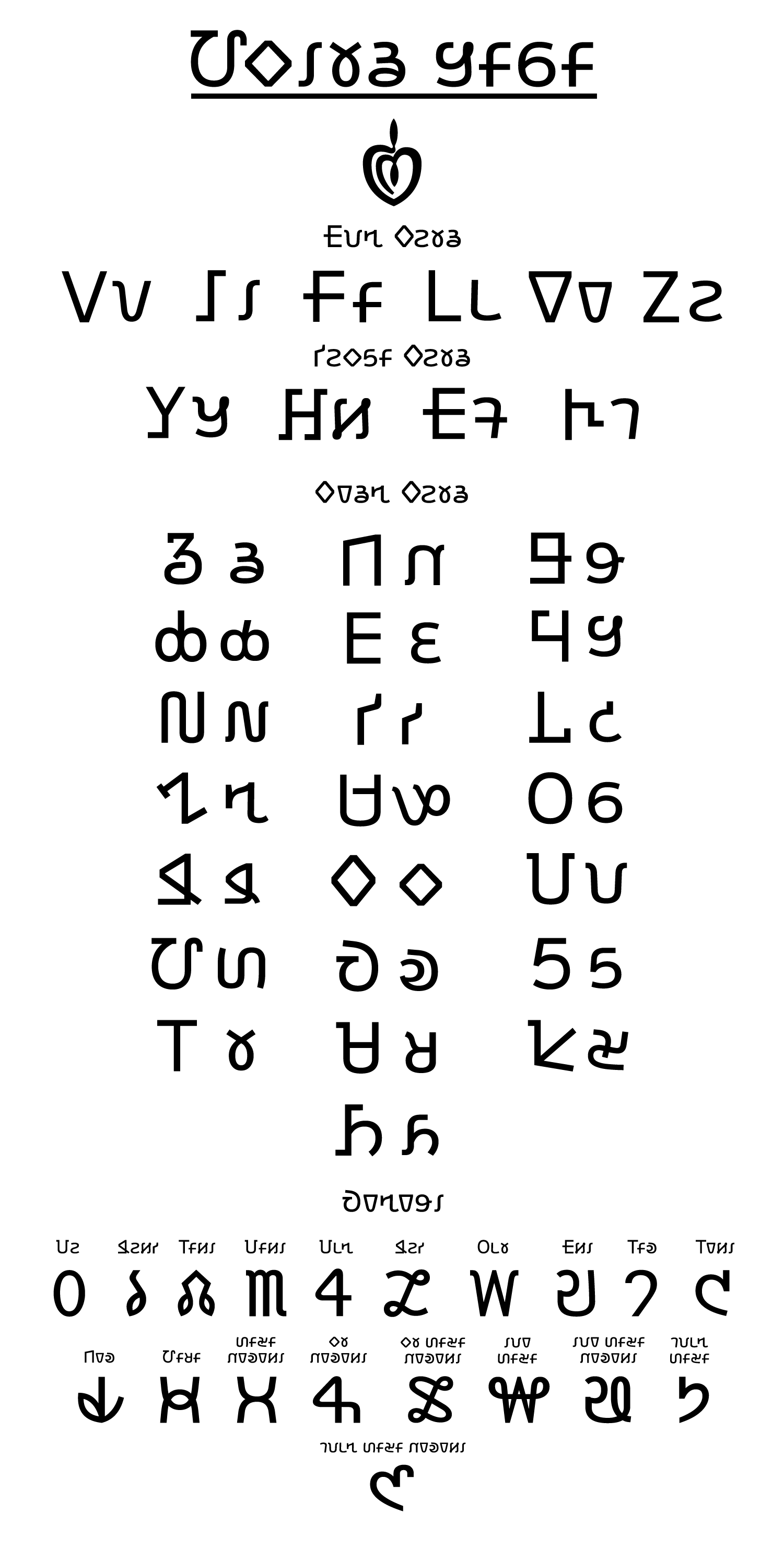

Warang Citi is a Unicode block containing characters for Warang Citi (Varang Kshiti) script which is used by some to write the Ho language.

Warang Citi^{[1]}^{[2]} Official Unicode Consortium code chart (PDF)
| | 0 | 1 | 2 | 3 | 4 | 5 | 6 | 7 | 8 | 9 | A | B | C | D | E | F |
| U+118Ax | 𑢠 | 𑢡 | 𑢢 | 𑢣 | 𑢤 | 𑢥 | 𑢦 | 𑢧 | 𑢨 | 𑢩 | 𑢪 | 𑢫 | 𑢬 | 𑢭 | 𑢮 | 𑢯 |
| U+118Bx | 𑢰 | 𑢱 | 𑢲 | 𑢳 | 𑢴 | 𑢵 | 𑢶 | 𑢷 | 𑢸 | 𑢹 | 𑢺 | 𑢻 | 𑢼 | 𑢽 | 𑢾 | 𑢿 |
| U+118Cx | 𑣀 | 𑣁 | 𑣂 | 𑣃 | 𑣄 | 𑣅 | 𑣆 | 𑣇 | 𑣈 | 𑣉 | 𑣊 | 𑣋 | 𑣌 | 𑣍 | 𑣎 | 𑣏 |
| U+118Dx | 𑣐 | 𑣑 | 𑣒 | 𑣓 | 𑣔 | 𑣕 | 𑣖 | 𑣗 | 𑣘 | 𑣙 | 𑣚 | 𑣛 | 𑣜 | 𑣝 | 𑣞 | 𑣟 |
| U+118Ex | 𑣠 | 𑣡 | 𑣢 | 𑣣 | 𑣤 | 𑣥 | 𑣦 | 𑣧 | 𑣨 | 𑣩 | 𑣪 | 𑣫 | 𑣬 | 𑣭 | 𑣮 | 𑣯 |
| U+118Fx | 𑣰 | 𑣱 | 𑣲 | | | | | | | | | | | | | 𑣿 |
Notes 1.As of Unicode version 17.0 2.Grey areas indicate non-assigned code points.

== History ==
The following Unicode-related documents record the purpose and process of defining specific characters in the Warang Citi block:

| Version | Final code points (Note: Proposed code points and characters names may differ from final code points and names) | Count | L2 ID | WG2 ID | Document |
|---|---|---|---|---|---|
| 7.0 | U+118A0..118F2, 118FF | 84 | L2/99-058 | N1958 | Everson, Michael (1999-01-29), Proposal for encoding the Varang Kshiti script in the BMP of the UCS |
| 7.0 | U+118A0..118F2, 118FF | 84 | L2/07-137 | | Harrison, K. David; Anderson, Gregory (2007-04-22), Review of Proposal for Encoding Warang Chiti (Ho orthography) in Unicode |
| 7.0 | U+118A0..118F2, 118FF | 84 | L2/08-130 | N3411 | Everson, Michael (2008-04-08), Preliminary proposal for encoding the Varang Kshiti script in the UCS |
| 7.0 | U+118A0..118F2, 118FF | 84 | L2/09-291 | N3668 | Everson, Michael (2009-08-05), Proposal for encoding the Warang Citi script in the BMP of the UCS |
| 7.0 | U+118A0..118F2, 118FF | 84 | L2/11-444 | N4176 | Everson, Michael (2011-12-31), Revised proposal for encoding the Warang Citi script in the SMP |
| 7.0 | U+118A0..118F2, 118FF | 84 | L2/12-031 | | Anderson, Deborah; McGowan, Rick; Whistler, Ken (2012-01-27), "VIII. WARANG CITI", Review of Indic-related L2 documents and Recommendations to the UTC |
| 7.0 | U+118A0..118F2, 118FF | 84 | L2/12-118 | N4259 | Everson, Michael (2012-04-19), Final proposal for encoding the Warang Citi script |
| 7.0 | U+118A0..118F2, 118FF | 84 | L2/12-147 | | Anderson, Deborah; McGowan, Rick; Whistler, Ken (2012-04-25), "X. WARANG CITI", Review of Indic-related L2 documents and Recommendations to the UTC |
| 7.0 | U+118A0..118F2, 118FF | 84 | L2/12-112 | | Moore, Lisa (2012-05-17), "D.11", UTC #131 / L2 #228 Minutes |
