= India–Ivory Coast relations =

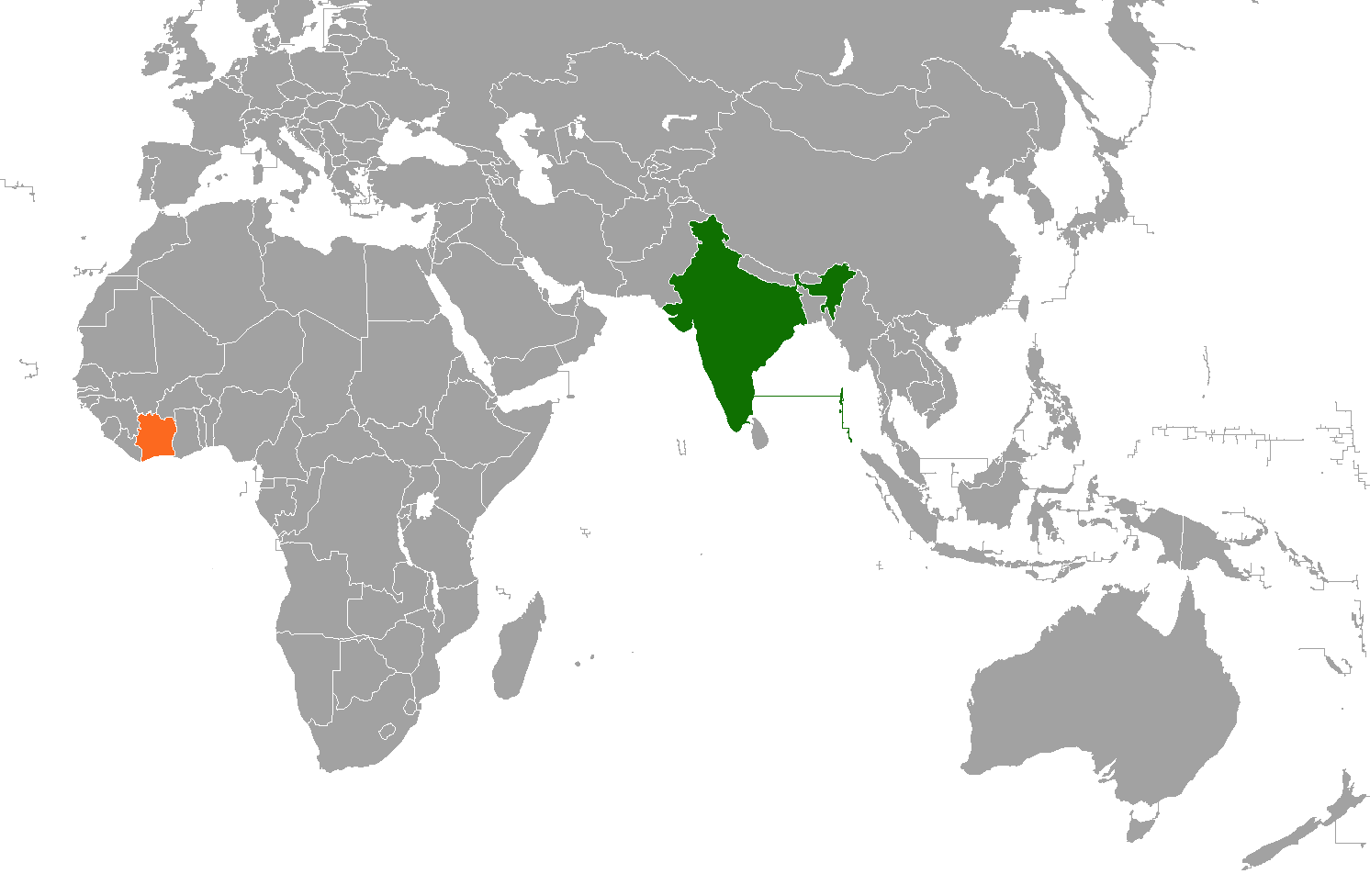
- India: Ivory Coast

The bilateral relations between the Republic of India and the Republic of Côte d'Ivoire have considerably expanded in recent years as India seeks to develop an extensive commercial and strategic partnership in the West African region. The Indian diplomatic mission in Abidjan was opened in 1979. Ivory Coast opened its resident mission in New Delhi in September 2004. Both nations are currently fostering efforts to increase trade, investments and economic cooperation.

== Commercial and economic relations ==
According to the Indian ambassador to Ivory Coast, India plans to invest $1 billion into developing oil and mining projects over the next five years. In the last ten years, the total amount of announced Indian FDI abroad has been more than $10 billion. From India's energy security viewpoint, Ivory Coast has emerged as an important destination for investment opportunities in hydrocarbon exploration and diamonds. Recent BBC reports have drawn attention to the emerging importance of Africa in India's foreign economic policy and the special role that West Africa is now occupying. India hopes to tap into the region's vast oil wealth by accessing the Gulf of Guinea's shoreline.

Oil production in Ivory Coast stands at more than 60,000 barrels per day. India's ONGC has already invested $12m to explore an offshore block in the region, that it is now drilling.

India is also facilitating the development of an IT-come-Technology Park in Abidjan, named after Mahatma Gandhi. India's Minister of State for Commerce, Jairam Ramesh, has said both countries are also cooperating in new areas such as pharmaceuticals, transport, water supply and telecommunications. Addressing the second Indo-Ivory Coast Joint Trade Commission, the Indian Commerce Minister stated that India wanted to establish a "strategic partnership" with Ivory Coast to develop diamond mining, cutting and polishing, which would offer employment to the local population.

India's Tata Steel and SODEMI (Ivorian state-owned company for mineral development) have entered into a joint venture agreement (JVA) for the development of Mount Nimba Iron ore deposits in Ivory Coast (West Africa). The Mt Nimba deposit, spread over 3 countries – Liberia, Guinea and Ivory Coast, is one of the biggest in the Africa. With Ivory Coast still maintaining its status as the economic powerhouse of French West Africa, India is looking to open new factories in the country. Ivory Coast's Minister of Mines, Energy and Petroleum, Monnet Leon, has also urged India to make use of Ivory Coast's vast mineral resources, including bauxite, limestone, iron ore, manganese, nickel, gold and diamonds which have not been significantly explored. Ivory Coast's business community has proclaimed that India, being the world's largest democracy, can help Ivorians cement democracy in their country and bring in stabilisation through economic process. India has also been one of the largest troop contributors to the UN peace-keeping mission in the Ivory Coast.

== India’s new economic diplomacy in Africa ==
In a bid to expand its economic reach, India launched an initiative in 2004 called Techno-Economic Approach for Africa–India Movement (TEAM–9), together with eight energy- and resource-rich West African countries, including Ivory Coast, Senegal, Mali, Guinea-Bissau, Ghana, and Burkina Faso. According to the Indian Ministry of External Affairs, the initiative was part of a broader policy to engage the underdeveloped, yet resource-wealthy countries of West Africa, which required both low-cost technology and investment to develop their infrastructure. In particular, India increasingly wants to play an important role in helping Ivory Coast and other West African countries channel their energy resources more efficiently.

Ambassador Shamma Jain also states that there is also a growing demand for courses run by ITEC and SCAAP on information technology, rural credit, small- and medium-scale industries, women's entrepreneurship and quality control, which is creating a 'constituency of interest' in India. In August 2006, Ivorian Foreign Minister Youssouf Bakayoko led a 110-member delegation, comprising top Ivorian entrepreneurs and government ministers, to the Indo-Ivorian trade commission meeting in New Delhi, where they drafted dozens of agreements to be signed later in the year.

In January 2009, Ivory Coast conferred its highest award upon the Indian Minister of State for External Affairs Anand Sharma. India's Deputy Foreign Minister Sharma accompanied by Ambassador Shamma Jain and a high-level delegation discussed an entire gamut of issues during his visit to Ivory Coast with President Laurent Gbagbo that included the UN reforms, expansion of the UN Security Council and reshaping of the global financial infrastructure. Ivory Coast expressed its vociferous condemnation of the 2008 Mumbai attacks and the forces behind it and reiterated its solidarity with India in its combat against terror. President Gbagbo reaffirmed his government's appreciation of India's leadership role, its economic strength, and above all, its willingness to share its expertise, technology and development experience with African countries. Against this backdrop, in a gesture that underlined the special ties with India, President Laurent Gbagbo conferred the Commander of the National Order, the country's highest civilian award in recognition of the Indian Foreign Minister's distinct role in strengthening India's relationship with Ivory Coast and the African continent.

== See also ==
- Embassy of India, Abidjan
