= Shamma Jain =

Indian diplomat

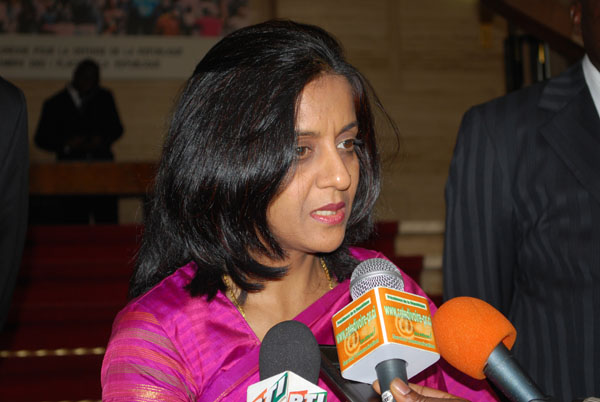

Indian Ambassador to Greece
- In office June 2017 – October 2019

Indian Ambassador to Panama, Costa Rica and Nicaragua
- In office May 2014 – June 2017

Indian Ambassador to Ivory Coast, Liberia, Sierra Leone and Guinea
- In office August 2008 – August 2011

Vice Ambassador of India to Italy and San Marino
- In office July 2004 – August 2008

Personal details
- Born: Jammu, Jammu & Kashmir, India
- Children: 1
- Profession: Diplomat

Shamma Jain (born 1959) is a senior Indian diplomat who served as the Indian Ambassador to Greece from June 2017 up to October 2019. She has also served as the Ambassador of India to Panama, Costa Rica, Nicaragua, Ivory Coast, Liberia, Sierra Leone and Guinea from 2008 to 2011. Aside from serving as an ambassador, Jain has held other high-level diplomatic roles, including as the Vice Ambassador of India to Italy and San Marino, Political Counsellor in the United States, and at the Permanent Delegation of India to UNESCO in Paris.

== Early life and education ==
Shamma Jain was born in Jammu, Jammu & Kashmir. She was awarded the Chancellor's gold medal for B.A. in political science at University of Jammu. She received double master's degrees in Philosophy and Politics from Jawaharlal Nehru University in New Delhi. She was the recipient of the prestigious UGC Fellowship.

== Career ==
Jain began her diplomatic career with the Indian Foreign Service in 1983. Prior to being appointed as the Indian Ambassador to Panama, she headed the Counter Terrorism Division, overseeing all matters related to counter terrorism diplomacy, and the Policy Planning & Research Division at the Ministry of External Affairs in New Delhi. Ambassador Jain also served as the Joint Secretary of the Indian Council of World Affairs, India's oldest foreign policy think tank.

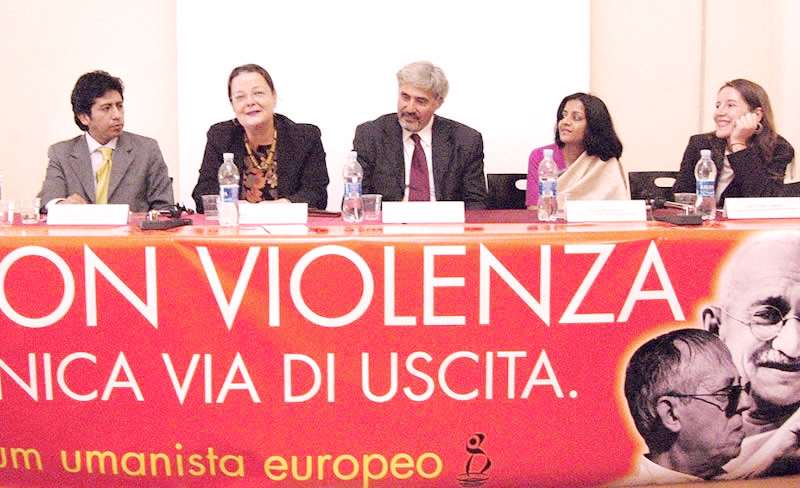
Ambassador Shamma Jain (second from right) on the occasion of International Day of Non-Violence in Rome, Italy

Jain used to be the Vice Ambassador and Deputy Chief of Mission at the Embassy of India in Rome, Italy. She also served as First Secretary of the Indian Delegation to UNESCO in Paris, and as Political Counselor at the Embassy of India, Washington, D.C. from 1997 to 2001, where she was responsible for bilateral political and strategic ties between the United States and India.

From 2003 to 2005, she served as the Deputy Chief of Mission and Chargé d'Affaires in Manila, Philippines. Prior to this, she was the Director of SAARC with responsibility for advancing India's policy agenda in the South Asia region. Ambassador Jain has also held diplomatic assignments in Turkey and Argentina.

In recognition of advancing bilateral trade between India and Panama, Ambassador Jain was presented the key to the City of David, the capital of the western province of Chiriqui, Panama on July 22, 2016.

Ambassador Jain was the 2009 Commencement speaker at the University of Liberia, where she was awarded the degree of Doctor of Letters (Honoris Causa). She also served as the commencement speaker for the British Institute of Management and Technology's 2009 graduating class. She has one son, Ishan.

== Ambassador to Ivory Coast ==
Jain was appointed as the Indian Ambassador to Ivory Coast, with concurrent accreditation to Liberia, Sierra Leone, and Guinea in August 2008. During her tenure, there was a dramatic increase in commercial, trade and cultural ties between West Africa and India. These closer economic links have provided the impetus for India's trade with West Africa to grow to $40 billion by 2015.

She led India's efforts to deepen engagement with West Africa through intensifying relations with Economic Community of West African States (ECOWAS), and enhancing co-operation in the area of oil and gas, education, pharmaceuticals, mining and infrastructure. As India's ambassador to Ivory Coast, she argued that capacity building is a major thrust of India's development co-operation with Africa. She advocated for the establishment of over a hundred professional training institutes across Africa, for which India allocated $700 million. Along with the former Minister of State for External Affairs Shashi Tharoor, she was responsible for gaining Liberian support for a permanent seat for India on the UN Security Council.

=== Ivorian civil war ===
Despite facing grave danger, Shamma Jain oversaw the evacuation of Indian nationals in Ivory Coast who were caught in the Second Ivorian Civil War in March 2011. This coincided with India voting in the UN Security Council for sanctions against Laurent Gbagbo and close aides. Amidst heavy gunfire and explosions in the diplomatic area where her residence was located, Ambassador Jain remained in Abidjan to ensure the evacuation of several hundred members of the Indian community.

On 8 April 2011, Jain had to be evacuated by French troops when her residence in Cocody, Abidjan was attacked by armed mercenaries. She had been trapped in her house, which was adjacent to Gbagbo's besieged presidential compound. This area witnessed the heaviest fighting in the capital between the opposing forces of incumbent Gbagbo and Alassane Ouattara. After many hours of being holed up in her residence, Ambassador Jain was safely evacuated in a daring operation by UN and French forces to a French military base outside Abidjan.

== See also ==
- Syed Akbaruddin
