= Lako Bodra =

Indian leader, writer, and linguist (1919–1986)

- Born: 19 September 1919; Paseya, Khutpani, West Singhbhum, Jharkhand, India
- Died: 29 June 1986 (aged 66)
- Occupations: Poet, Writer, Dramatist
- Writing career
- Pen name: Kol Lako Bodra
- Subjects: Writer & Linguistic
- Notable works: Saraswati Gowari; Baha Buru-Bonga Buru; Kol Rule; Halang Halpung; Sahar Hora; Ela ol itu uta; Hora bara; Homoyom puti; Raghu bongsh; Pompo; Ho Bakna; Sishu Halang
- Literary movement: Language & Linguistic Identity with Self determination
- Website: lakobodra.ipil.co.in

Lako Bodra (Ho: 𑢵 𑢫𑣃𑣜𑣃 𑢬𑣉𑣚 𑢺𑣁𑣌𑣉 𑢷𑣉𑣔𑣜𑣁; 19 September 1919 – 29 June 1986) is the creator of the Warang Chiti writing system used for writing the Ho language.

== Early life ==
Lako Bodra was born on 19 September 1919 in Paseya village, Khutpani Block, West Singhbhum, Jharkhand to a humble and religious family of Lebeya and Jano Kui Bodra. He started his primary education at Badchom Hatu primary school. After completing his primary school he took admission in Purueya primary school. In Purueya he completed his 8th class then his parents sent him to his maternal uncle's home in Chakradharpur. In Chakradharpur, he was admitted to the Grammar High School in 9th class. After completing his 9th class he went to Chaibasa for further studies. He took admission in matriculation in District High School, Chaibasa. After completing matriculation there, he moved to Jalandhar, Punjab with the help of Jaipal Singh for further education and attended Jalandhar city college where he graduated in Homeopathy.

== Professional life and Warang Chiti ==
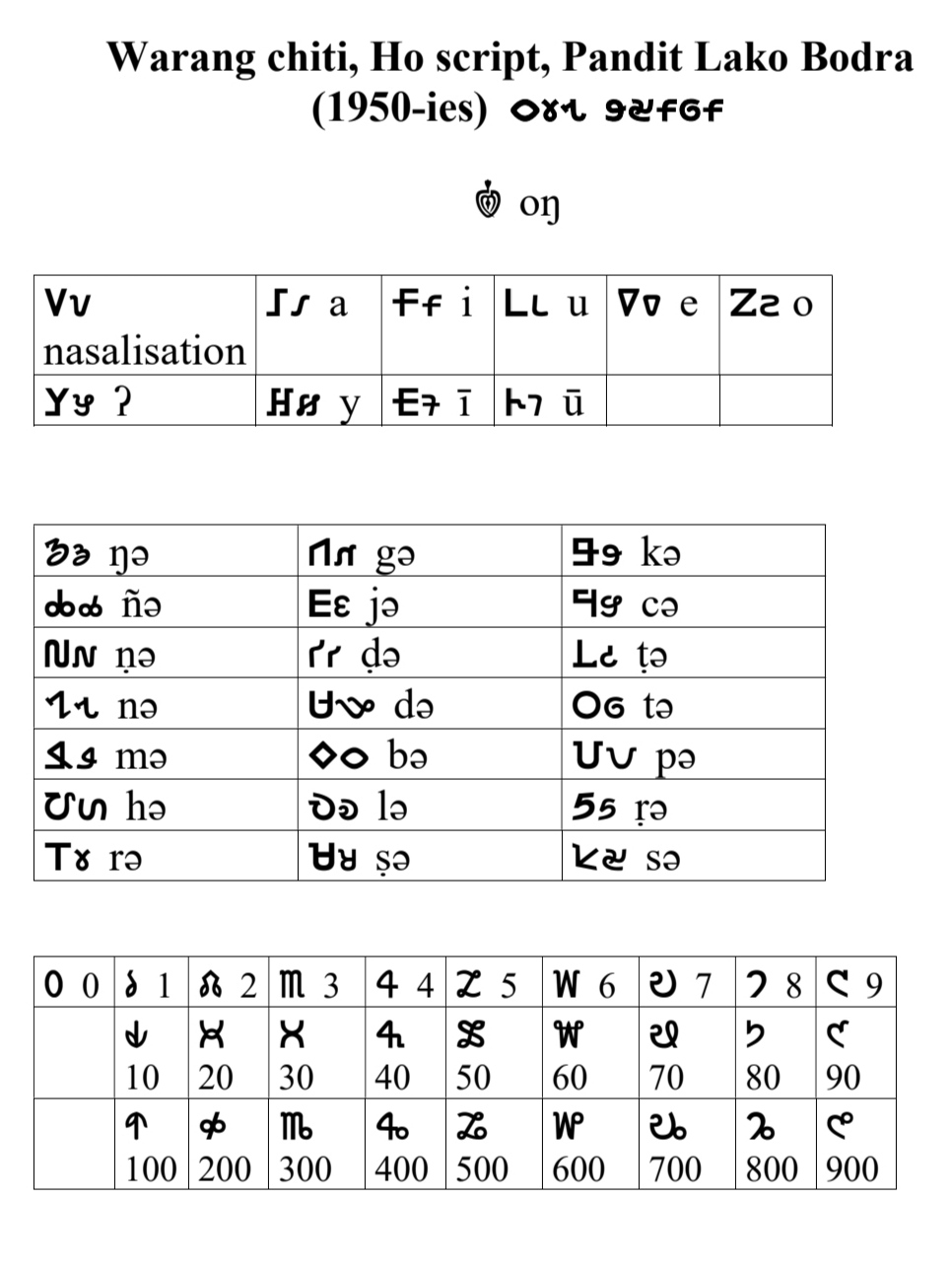
Chart of Warang Chiti.

After completing his education he went back home. Then he got a job in Indian Railways as a clerk and was posted to Danguwapasi. During his job in railways he invented the Warang Chiti alphabet. For spreading it, he created Adi Samaj (Dupub Huda) in Jodapokhar, Jhinkpani by help of Mr. Mahati Bandara. Adi Samaj meetings were held in a house in the ACC cement plant colony in Jhinkpani. Near by village people came to the Adi Samaj to become literate in Warang Chiti.
