= Mage Parab =

Principal festival celebrated among the Ho people of eastern India

"Dama" and "Dumang" (percussion instruments) players play a tune from Mage Parab, explaining making of the instruments in Ho language

Mage Parab (or Mage Porob) is the principal festival celebrated among the Ho people of eastern India, and is also celebrated by the Munda and Bhumij people. It is not celebrated by any other Munda-speaking peoples like Juang, Gadab and is much less prominent to the Mundas (including Bhumijs) than to the Hos. It is held in the month of Mage ponai (Magh month) in honor of the deity Singbonga who, in the Ho creation myth, created Luku Kola, the first man on Earth. It was first described in 1912 by Indian anthropologist Rai Bahadur Sarat Chandra Roy in his The Mundas and their Country. Locally, It is also called Magh Porob in some tribal villages.
