= Sushila Kerketta =

Indian politician

Member of Parliament, Lok Sabha
- In office 16 May 2004 — 16 May 2009
- Preceded by: Kariya Munda
- Succeeded by: Kariya Munda
- Constituency: Khunti

Personal details
- Born: 27 April 1939 Ranchi, Jharkhand
- Died: 19 October 2009 (aged 70) Khunti, Jharkhand
- Party: Indian National Congress
- Spouse: Nottrott Kerketta
- Children: 3 sons and 2 daughters
- As of 25 September, 2006

Sushila Kerketta (27 April 1939 – 19 October 2009) was a member of the Bihar Vidhan Sabha from 1985 to 2000 and also in Lok sabha from Khunti.

She held several important portfolios in the Bihar government. She was minister of state for irrigation (independent charge) from 1985 to 1988. She was promoted to cabinet rank in 1989 and headed mines and geology and the food and civil supplies departments.

She represented the Khunti constituency of Jharkhand and was a member of the Indian National Congress. She was also a lecturer in the Birsa College, Khunti and later went on to become its principal.

== Early life and education ==
Sushila Kerketta was born on 27 April 1939 in Ranchi, Bihar to Prabhudayal Marki and Maini Marki. She did a bachelor in education and a masters in philosophy from St. Xavier's College, Ranchi.

Later she was married to Shri Nottrot Kerketta on 28 Dec. 1970 and had three sons and two daughters named Roshan, Praween, Naveen, Sandhya and Asha.

== Personal interests ==
Kerketta was a social worker and teacher who regularly visited local villages and promoted such enterprises as local hand looms. Her sports interests included archery, football and hockey. She led the Jharkhand Women Hockey Association, Mahila Hockey Association, Chotanagpur, and the Bihar Women Hockey Association.

== Positions held ==
- 1985–2000 Member, Bihar Legislative Assembly (three terms)
- 1985–88 Minister of State, (Independent Charge), Irrigation, Government of Bihar
- 1988–89 Cabinet Minister, Rural Development, Food and Civil Supply, Government of Bihar
- 1989–90 Cabinet Minister, Mines and Geology, Government of Bihar
- 1990–95 Co-ordinator, Public Accounts Committee, Bihar Legislative Assembly; Co-ordinator, Nivadan Committee, Bihar Legislative Assembly
- 1990–2000 Deputy Leader, Congress Party, Bihar Legislative Assembly; Chairman, Child & Woman Development Committee (two terms)
- 2004 Elected to 14th Lok Sabha; Member, Committee on Empowerment of Women; Member, Committee on Labour
- 16 August 2006 Member, Committee on Empowerment of Women
- 5 August 2007 Member, Standing Committee on Labour

== Personal life ==
She married Nottrott Kerketta on 28 December 1970 and later had three sons and two daughters. Nottrot preceded her in death.

Kerketta died in Ranchi on 19 December 2009 following a heart attack. She was 70 and is survived by three sons and a daughter.

Kerketta had been staying with her eldest son Roshan Kumar Surin and had not been keeping well for the last few weeks. She suffered a heart attack at noon and was rushed to the nearby Raj Hospital by her family, where efforts to save her failed.

She was the mother-in-law of retired IFS diplomat Amrit Lugun who was the accused in the Lalita Oraon sexual assault controversy in France in 1999 and served as the Ambassador to Yemen during Operation Rahat in 2015 and as the Ambassador of India to Greece from 2020 to 2022.
