= Sushila Samad =

Adivasi Hindi poet (b. 1906, d. 1960)

Sushila Samad or Sushila Samanta (Hindi: सुशीला सामद) (7 June 1906 – 10 December 1960) was an Adivasi Hindi poet, journalist, editor, and publisher. She was an active organiser of the Indian freedom movement. She belongs to the Munda tribal family of the village of Laujoda in the Indian state of Jharkhand.

== Early life and education ==
She was born at the house of mother Lalmani Sandil and father Mohan Ram Sandil. In 1931, Sushila Samad passed the first class examination from Prayag-Mahila Vidyapeeth. In 1932 she completed the education of Vinodini and Vidushee (BA Honors) in 1934.

== Work ==
She was the first Adivasi woman in India to become a 'Hindi Vidushee'. From 1925 to 1930, she edited and published literary-social magazine Chandni. She was Gandhi's only tribal woman 'Surajee' (freedom fighter). She served as MLC and carried out social-cultural, literary responsibilities. Her two poetry collections were Prallap (1935) and Sapne Ka Sansar (1948).
