= Warang Citi =

Writing script for Ho language of India

Warang Citi 𑢹𑣗𑣁𑣜𑣊 𑢯𑣂𑣕𑣂
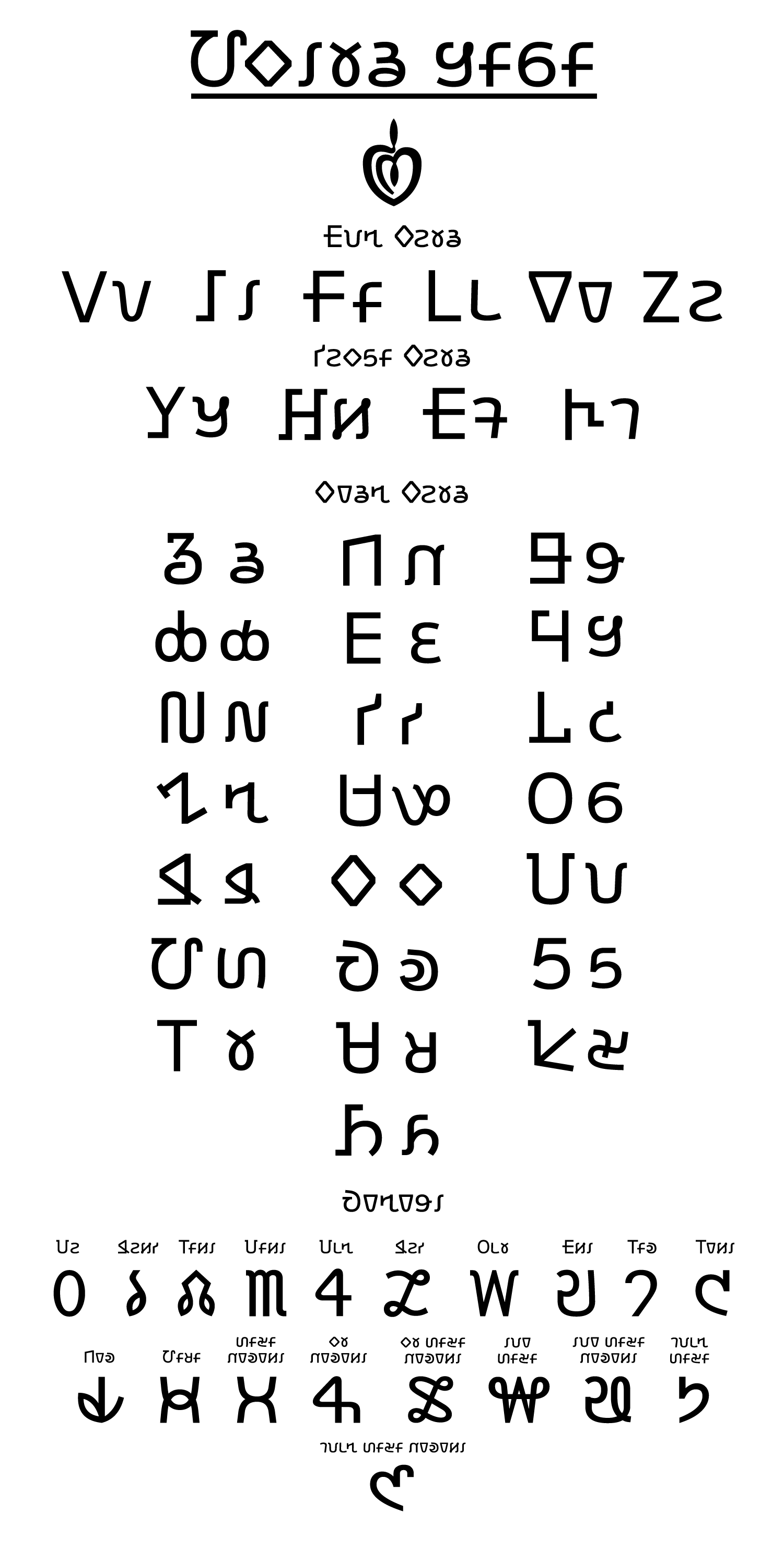
- Warang Citi Alphabet with Uppercase and lowercase forms.
- Script type: Alphabet
- Creator: Lako Bodra
- Period: 1950s — present
- Direction: Left-to-right
- Languages: Ho

Related scripts
- Parent systems: original invention: Warang Citi

ISO 15924
- ISO 15924: Wara (262), Warang Citi (Varang Kshiti)

Unicode
- Unicode alias: Warang Citi
- Unicode range: U+118A0–U+118FF

Warang Chiti (also written Varang Kshiti; Ho: 𑢹𑣗𑣁𑣜𑣊 𑣏𑣂𑣕𑣂, IPA: [wɐrɐŋ ʧɪt̪ɪ]) is a writing system invented by Lako Bodra for the Ho language spoken in East India. It is used in primary and adult education and in various publications.

It has mainly gained acceptance among the easternmost group of speakers, and is more prevalent among those who have been educated in it. Many other speakers prefer oral transmission of knowledge, Devanagari, or Latin, but Warang Chiti holds prestige among many Ho speakers.

== History ==
Community leader Bodra invented it as an alternative to the writing systems devised by Christian missionaries. He claims that the alphabet was invented in the 13th century by Deowan Turi, and that it was rediscovered in a shamanistic vision and Bodra modernized.

== Letters ==
Warang Citi is quite distinct from other writing systems of India, and it has features of an abugida and an alphabet. As in Brahmic abugidas, consonant letters have an inherent vowel, usually /a/ or /ɔ/ but sometimes /ɛ/. The inherent vowel is not pronounced at the end of the word. Unlike in Brahmic abugidas, and more like in an alphabet, the full vowel letters are always written after the consonant, letters usually don't form ligatures, and there is no virama character.

It follows capitalization rules as are done in English and follows English punctuation. There are few ligatures that combine to form new sounds, and there are conjunct consonants that are used as well by stacking in some cases. It is written from left to right in horizontal lines.

The script begins with the letter Ong, which corresponds to Om in other Brahmic scripts. It has 32 letters in total with capital and small letters.

ong 𑣿 om	ngaa 𑢠𑣀 ṃ, ŋ (Note: nasalisation))	a 𑢡𑣁 a	wi 𑢢𑣂 i	yu 𑢣𑣃 u	ya 𑢤𑣄 ʔ (Note: glottal stop)	yo 𑢥𑣅 y	ii 𑢦𑣆 ī	uu 𑢧𑣇 ū	e 𑢨𑣈 e	O 𑢩𑣉 o
ang 𑢪𑣊 ṅ	ga 𑢫𑣋 g	ko 𑢬𑣌 k	eny 𑢭𑣍 ñ	yuj 𑢮𑣎 j	uc 𑢯𑣏 c	enn 𑢰𑣐 ṇ	odd 𑢱𑣑 ḍ	tte 𑢲𑣒 ṭ	nung 𑢳𑣓 n	da: 𑢴𑣔 d
ot 𑢵𑣕 t	am 𑢶𑣖 m	bu 𑢷𑣗 b	pu 𑢸𑣘 p	hiyo 𑢹𑣙 h	holo 𑢺𑣚 l	horr 𑢻𑣛 ṛ	har 𑢼𑣜 r	ssuu 𑢽𑣝 ṣ	sii 𑢾𑣞 s	viyo 𑢿𑣟 (Note: ligature of 𑢡 and 𑢹)

Uppercase

Lowercase

The word 'Warang Chiti' (Hbårŋ chiti) 'Undying Writing' in Warang Chiti alphabet

'Ong' in Warang Citi script

== Numerals ==
Warang Citi uses its own set of numerals. The digits 0–9 are used in modern writing, but the signs for larger numbers are falling into disuse.

1 𑣡	2 𑣢	3 𑣣	4 𑣤	5 𑣥	6 𑣦	7 𑣧	8 𑣨	9 𑣩	0 𑣠
10 𑣪	20 𑣫	30 𑣬	40 𑣭	50 𑣮	60 𑣯	70 𑣰	80 𑣱	90 𑣲	

== Unicode ==
Warang Citi was added to the Unicode Standard in June 2014 with the release of version 7.0.

The Unicode block for Warang Citi is U+118A0–U+118FF. Grey areas indicate non-assigned code points:

Warang Citi^{[1]}^{[2]} Official Unicode Consortium code chart (PDF)
	0	1	2	3	4	5	6	7	8	9	A	B	C	D	E	F
U+118Ax	𑢠	𑢡	𑢢	𑢣	𑢤	𑢥	𑢦	𑢧	𑢨	𑢩	𑢪	𑢫	𑢬	𑢭	𑢮	𑢯
U+118Bx	𑢰	𑢱	𑢲	𑢳	𑢴	𑢵	𑢶	𑢷	𑢸	𑢹	𑢺	𑢻	𑢼	𑢽	𑢾	𑢿
U+118Cx	𑣀	𑣁	𑣂	𑣃	𑣄	𑣅	𑣆	𑣇	𑣈	𑣉	𑣊	𑣋	𑣌	𑣍	𑣎	𑣏
U+118Dx	𑣐	𑣑	𑣒	𑣓	𑣔	𑣕	𑣖	𑣗	𑣘	𑣙	𑣚	𑣛	𑣜	𑣝	𑣞	𑣟
U+118Ex	𑣠	𑣡	𑣢	𑣣	𑣤	𑣥	𑣦	𑣧	𑣨	𑣩	𑣪	𑣫	𑣬	𑣭	𑣮	𑣯
U+118Fx	𑣰	𑣱	𑣲													𑣿
Notes 1.As of Unicode version 18.0 2.Grey areas indicate non-assigned code points.
