= Khuntipani =

Village in Jharkhand, India

Coordinates: 22.632°N 85.718°E

Khuntpani
- Block
- Interactive map of Khuntpani
- Country: India

Khuntpani (Odia:ଖୁଣ୍ଟପାଣି ) is a town in the West Singhbhum district, in the Indian state of Jharkhand.

== Geography ==
Khuntpani is located 12 km north of district headquarters Chaibasa. It is a block headquarters.

Khuntpani is bordered by West Singhbhum Block on its south, Chaibasa Block on its south, Kharsawan Block on its north and Chakradharpur Block towards west .

Chaibasa, Chakradharpur, Barughutu and Chandil are nearby cities.

Khuntpani is on the border between West Singhbhum District and Saraikela Kharsawan District.

== Demographics ==
Odia is the Local Language along with Ho(Dominant), Mundari.

== Politics ==
J V (P), Bharatiya Janata Party, JMM, JKP and Indian National Congress are the major political parties.

== Transport ==
=== Rail ===
Pandrasali Railway Station and Barabambo Railway Station are the nearest stations.
