= List of ambassadors of India to Greece =

Ambassador of India to Greece
- Incumbent; Rudrendra Tandon, IFS since 27 June 2023
- Nominator: Ram Nath Kovind
- Term length: no fixed term length
- Inaugural holder: L. N Rangarajan
- Formation: 1978
- Website: Embassy of India, Athens, Greece

The Indian Ambassador to Greece is the chief diplomatic representative of India to Greece, housed in Athens.

== List of Indian Ambassadors to Greece ==
The following people have served as Indian Ambassadors to the Hellenic Republic.

Name	Entered office	Left office
L. N. Rangarajan	1978	1981
R. C. Arorai	1981	1984
B. P. Agarwal	1984	1988
H. C. S. Dhody	1988	1991
P. K.Singh	1991	1992
Aftab Seth	1992	1996
G. S. Bedi	1996	2001
A. K. Banerjee	2001	2005
Bhaskar Balakrishnan	2005	2007
Dilip Sinha	2007	2010
Tsewang Topden	2010	30 June 2015
M. Manimekalai	13 July 2015	31 August 2017
Shamma Jain	23 December 2017	2 October 2019
Amrit Lugun	3 October 2019	31 May 2023
Rudrendra Tandon	27 June 2023	

== See also ==
- Embassy of India, Athens
