= Thakurmunda =

Thakurmunda is a block headquarter and a small village in Mayurbhanj district in the state of Odisha, India. Thakurmunda is referred as the largest block of Mayurbhanj district having a radius of 40kms. The nearest town is Karanjia (An NAC and also one of the sub-divisions of Mayurbhanj district), the nearest city is Baripada. Thakurmunda is a place to stay and tour the Mayurbhanj region. This region is home to Similipal, one of the most important wildlife parks of India. The national park comprises lush valleys, forest lands and scores of ancient temples.

Udaa Jatra is one of the main attractions of Thakurmunda. Thakurmunda also hosts the third most popular Ratha Jatra of Mayurbhanj. Thakurmunda is also the home of the Mayurbhanj Chaangu dance, an ancient tribal dance and famous for its Tusu Jatra on Makar Sankranthi.

== Geography ==
Thakurmunda is located at 21.31°N 86.09°E. It has an average elevation of 36 metres (118 feet).

== Education ==
Though a tribal village, several reputed schools are located here.

- Ramakrushna Paramhansa School
- Maa Basuli College
- Odisha Adarsa Bidyalaya
- Kanyashrama ( The Girl's Highschool)
- Boy's High school
- Kasturaba Gandhi Bidyalaya
- Government Primary, M.E School
- Aurovindo Public School
- Saraswati Sisu Mandira
- Heritage English Medium School
- Jay Prakash Narayan New Govt High School
- Mandaljhari UGUP school
- Kautilya International School

== Transportation ==
Thakurmunda has direct bus services from capital city Bhubaneswar, Cuttack, Baripada, Keonjhar, Balasore, Rourkela, Bhadrak, Jajpur. The nearest Airport is Biju Patnaik International Airport which is located at a distance of 182 KM from Thakurmunda.

- 54 KM from Kaptipada
- 62 KM from Udala
- 108 KM from Baripada
- 98 KM from Kendujhar
- 105 KM from Balasore railway station
- 38 KM from Karanjia

== Tourist places ==
1. Bhimkund is the nearest tourist place (around 18 km) from Thakurmunda.
2. Khiching (Maa Kichakeswari Temple) 63 km from Thakurmunda.
3. Bhairab Kund is another tourist place around 20 km from Thakurmunda besides river Salandi on SH Thakurmunda-Anandapur. There is a hilltop with spiritual activity.
4. Thakurmunda is popular for its Uda Yatra [Maha Bishuba Sankranthi] falling on 14 April each year. Devotees of Maa Basuli known as Bhakta recite spiritual activity by nailing in the back with iron nails and hanging themselves with a wooden log and making rounds at a high rising mast about 20 ft high.
