= Anuj Lugun =

Hindi poet & academic

Anuj Lugun is an Indian poet and writer. His poetry espoused indigenous renaissance and intense rebellion against fascism and oppression. Anuj's activism for social justice earned him the title of Tribal Poet.

== Early life and career ==
Born into a Jharkhandi Mundari family to Ereneus Lugun & Jaymmila Lugun in Jaldega Pahantoli, district Simdega, Jharkhand, Anuj is the nephew of William Lugun, a prominent leader of the Jharkhand movement.

== Work and service ==
Lugun is working as assistant professor in School of Languages and Literature at Central University of South Bihar (CUSB).

== Awards and recognition ==
- Sahitya Academy Yuva Puraskar 2019 for his long Hindi poem Bagh aur Sugna Munda ki Beti (The Tiger and the Daughter of Sugna Munda)
- Anuj Lugun- won the prestigious Bharat Bhushan Agarwal Award in 2011 for the best poem in Hindi
