= Amrit Lugun =

Indian politician

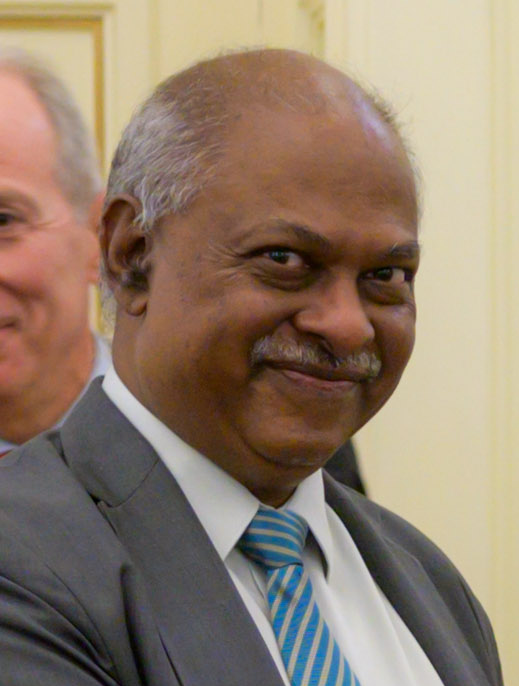
- Amrit Lugun
- Born: 22 November 1962 (age 63); Ranchi, Jharkhand, India
- Education: BA (Political science and sociology)
- Alma mater: St. Xavier's College, Kolkata
- Occupation: IFS Officer
- Years active: 1998–2023
- Relatives: Sushila Kerketta (mother-in-law)

Amrit Lugun (born 22 November 1962, in Ranchi, Jharkhand) is a retired IFS officer, who served as the Ambassador of India to Greece.

== Early life ==
Lugun's mother-in-law Sushila Kerketta was a Congress MLA and the party candidate from Khunti parliamentary constituency in Jharkhand.

== Career ==
Lugun served as Desk Officer for India Technical and Economic Cooperation Programme in the Ministry of External Affairs from July 1993 to June 1995. He was a Second Secretary, Embassy of India, Doha, Qatar from June 1995 to September 1998. He served as First Secretary at the Embassy of India, Paris, France from October 1998 to December 2001.

After Paris, Lugun was First Secretary at the Embassy of India, Algiers, Algeria from January 2002 to August 2004. At the Ministry of External Affairs from September 2004 to December 2008, he was a Director in the territorial divisions of Eurasia and Latin America. From March 2009 to September 2010 he was posted to the Indian Embassy, Manila. He then served as Director in the SAARC Secretariat in Kathmandu, Nepal.

Mr. Amrit Lugun was appointed as the Ambassador of India to the Republic of Yemen from 2013 to 2015. During his tenure in Yemen, he was commended for his contribution to Operation Raahat under which around 6500 people were evacuated from Yemen. Later he served as the Ambassador of India to Sudan, with concurrent accreditation to Eritrea from 2015 to 2017.

For the final assignment of his diplomatic career, Mr. Amrit Lugun was appointed as the Ambassador of India to Greece, serving from July 2020 to November 2022, where he focused on advancing bilateral ties, including defence and cultural cooperation.

== Lalita Oraon abuse case ==
While Lugun served as the First Secretary at the Indian Embassy in Paris in 1999, his family's live-in servant, Lalita Oraon, escaped from the household. She was put in the custody of the Committee Against Modern Slavery, an anti-slavery NGO, after being found on Paris streets by police. Oraon alleged she was beaten, threatened, and sexually abused by her employer.

The Indian Ambassador in Paris at the time Kanwal Sibal strongly supported Lugun and in a statement, the Indian Embassy accused the anti-slavery group of "indecent lies" against Lugun and claimed that some of the injuries were self-inflicted or due to escape. However, the allegations did not lead to any formal charges or court proceedings. Lalita Oraon did not pursue the matter legally, and there is no public record of any judicial conclusion. As a result, the case did not progress further beyond the initial media coverage and diplomatic controversy.
