= Janum Singh Soy =

Indian Ho-language writer

- Born: 8 August 1950 (age 75); Madkamahatu, West Singhbhum district, Jharkhand, India
- Occupations: Scholar, educationist, author
- Known for: Ho language and literature
- Awards: Padma Shri (2023)

Janum Singh Soy (born 8 August 1950) is an Indian scholar and author associated with the study and promotion of the Ho language and tribal literature of Jharkhand. He was awarded the Padma Shri in 2023 by the Government of India for his contribution to Ho language and literature.

== Early life ==
Janum Singh Soy was born on 8 August 1950 in Madkamahatu village in present-day West Singhbhum district of Jharkhand. He later became associated with Ghatshila, where he has resided.

== Academic career ==
Soy began his teaching career at Ghatsila College in the Department of Hindi. He subsequently joined Kolhan University, where he served as Head of the Department of Hindi. He worked for the inclusion of the Ho language in postgraduate curricula and was associated with academic initiatives relating to tribal language studies.

== Publications ==
Janum Singh Soy has authored six books related to Ho language, culture and society. His published works include:

- Baha Sagen
- Kuri Nam
- Horo Sagen
- Ho Kuri
- Ho Dishum Ho Honko
- Ho Bhasha Sahitya

His publications document aspects of Ho cultural traditions, customary practices, oral literature and linguistic usage.

== Honours ==
In 2023, he received the Padma Shri, India's fourth-highest civilian award, in the field of literature and education for his contribution to Ho language and literary development.
