= Ho language =

Austroasiatic language spoken in India

Ho
- 𑢹𑣉𑣉 𑣎𑣋𑣜 हो जगर • ହୋ ଜାଗାର
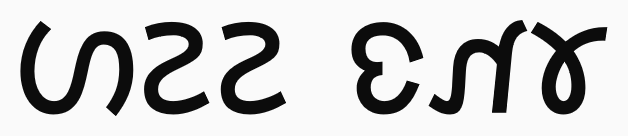
- 'Hoo Jagar' written in Warang Chiti
- Pronunciation: [d͡ʑägär]
- Native to: India
- Ethnicity: Ho people
- Native speakers: 1,421,418 (2011 census)
- Language family: Austroasiatic: Munda; North; Kherwarian; Mundaric; Ho
- Writing system: Warang Chiti; Devanagari; Latin script; Odia script; Bengali–Assamese

Official status
- Official language in: India: Jharkhand (additional)

Language codes
- ISO 639-3: hoc
- Glottolog: hooo1248
- Ho language speaking region

- Ho is classified as Vulnerable by the UNESCO Atlas of the World's Languages in Danger

Ho (Warang Chiti: 𑢹𑣉𑣉 𑣎𑣋𑣜, Ho pronunciation: [hoː dʑägär] (Note: Also known as Ho-Kaji; Jagar is a general term for used across languages like Mundari as well.)) is a Munda language of the Austroasiatic language family spoken primarily in India by about 2.2 million people (0.202% of India's population) per the 2001 census. It is spoken by the Ho, Munda, Kolha and Kol tribal communities of Jharkhand, Odisha, West Bengal and Assam and is written using Warang Chiti script. Devanagari, Latin and Odia script are also used, although native speakers are said to prefer Warang Chiti, invented by Lako Bodra.

The name Ho is derived from the native word hoo meaning human being, with cognates in its sister languages hoṛo in Mundari, ho̠ṛ in Santali and koro in Korku.

Ho is closely related to Mundari and Santali. Ho and Mundari are often described as sister languages. Ho is closer to the Hasadaḱ dialect of Mundari than the other varieties spoken in Jharkhand. While being ethnically and linguistically close, Ho and Mundari speakers form distinct regional identities.

== History ==
Ho has developed into an independent language as a result of various phonological and semantic changes from earlier forms common to North Munda languages. Most notable among these is the loss of intervocalic /ṛ/, leading to vowel length becoming phonemic. A common North Munda verb doho 'to put, to place', Santali do̠ho̠, Mundari dō takes on a vulgar meaning in Ho, many such semantic shifts make conversations with speakers of these related languages difficult. Ho speakers are believed to have entered Singhbhum form the North where Mundari, with two major dialects Hasadaḱ and Naguri is spoken. In terms of affinity, Ho is closer to the Hasadaḱ dialect in most respects, including the mutation of the glottalized final consonant /ʔɟ̥̚/ into /ʔᵉ/ or /ʔⁱ/. John Hoffmann considers there to be much less difference between Hasadaḱ and Ho than between Hasadaḱ and Naguri. Some forms in southern Kolhan resemble Naguri forms, such as the conjunction anḍoḱ 'moreover, and', while in northern Singhbhum it's oṛoḱ, as in Hasadaḱ. Ho in the north also maintains the Hasadaḱ contractions in certain verb forms like kić from ket́ić, lić from let́ić and -aić from -at́ić. Ho is also notable for its tendency to simplify common North Munda forms, Mundari oṛoṅ/uṛuṅ/oḍoṅ, Santali oḍok/oḍoṅ to /oːʔl/, Mundari, Santali selet́, seret́, irit́, ilat́ etc. to /seːʔl/, /seːʔr/, /iːʔr/ and /iːʔl/.

The first published written record of the Ho language is from 1844, which has a short word list dated 2 April 1824. Samuel Tickell published Grammatical construction of the Ho language in 1840. The first published Ho writing by an ethnic Ho is poetry of Kanuram Deogam in 1930.

The Latin, Devanagari and Warang Chiti scripts have been used in the field of teaching and learning. Since 1976, the Ho language is being imparted at intermediate and graduate level courses in different colleges under the Ranchi University and Kolhan University.

With TATA foundation help how HO community developed.

In erstwhile Bihar, the Information and Mass Communication department regularly published Ho articles, folk stories, songs in Devanagari script in a weekly named Adivasi Saptahik.

There are significant initiatives inculcated in development of Ho language. A pioneering work was started at Ete Turtung Akhara, Jhinkapani to study and develop the Ho language under the leadership of Lako Bodra with the help of Adi Sanskriti Evam Vigyan Sansthan. The institute published a book in 1963 titled Ho Hayam Paham Puti in Warang Chiti and introduced the letters of Warang Chiti.

A. Pathak and N.K. Verma tried to compare the Warang Chiti with Indus script in Echoes of Indus Valley. Sudhanshu Kumar Ray in his 'Indus Script' described that the script Warang Chiti resembles the script of Indus that was discovered by Ashok Pagal and Bulu Imam in the caves of Aswara hill near Baraka village.

Xavier Ho Publication, Lupungutu has been publishing Ho books in the Devanagri script. John Deeney published Ho Grammar and Vocabulary in 1975.

== Geographical distribution ==
Distribution of Ho language in the states of India (2011 census)
1. Jharkhand (70.0%)
2. Odisha (29.0%)
3. West Bengal (0.40%)
4. Madhya Pradesh (0.20%)
5. Other (0.40%)

Around half of all Ho speakers reside in West Singhbhum district of Jharkhand, where they form a majority. Ho speakers are also found in districts of East Singhbhum in southern Jharkhand, Mayurbhanj and Keonjhar in northern Odisha.

== Phonology ==
A Ho speaker demonstrates and says the names of body parts in Ho

=== Consonants ===
		Labial	Dental/ Alveolar	Retroflex	Palatal	Velar	Glottal
Nasal		m	n	(ɳ)	ɲ	ŋ	
Stop/ Affricate	voiceless	p	t	ʈ	t͡ɕ	k	ʔ
Stop/ Affricate	voiced	b	d	ɖ	d͡ʑ	ɡ	
Fricative			s				h
Approximant		w	l		j		
Tap			ɾ	ɽ			

- /b, ɖ/ can be heard as preglottalized [ˀb̥̚, ˀɖ̥̚] when in word-final position.
- /b/ can be heard as a fricative [β] in intervocalic positions.
- /ɳ/ has a limited phonemic distribution, and is typically a realization of /n/ before retroflex sounds.
- /w/ and /j/ only occur in medial or final positions.

=== Vowels ===
Ho has 5 basic vowels, these can be short, long, nasalized and long and nasalized. Long vowels either result from gemination of short vowels resulting from loss of intervocalic consonants or due to the bimoraic constraint inherited from Proto-Munda.

Oral vowels
	Front	Central	Back
Close	i iː		u uː
Mid	e eː		o oː
Open		a aː	

Nasal vowels
	Front	Central	Back
Close	ĩ		ũ
Mid	ẽ		õ
Open		ã	

== Grammar ==
Like other languages of the Munda family, Ho has a mostly suffixing agglutinative inflectional morphology and follows accusative morphosyntactic alignment. There is some debate on whether Munda languages have word classes, an item from any word class can function as a verb in Ho. Ho does not have relative pronouns natively and relies on the participle forms of verbs, the forms that includes aspect, object and transitivity, but no mood markers, to form relative clauses.

=== Nouns and noun phrases ===
Number, possession and case suffixes are added to nouns. Alienable and inalienable possessions are distinguished.

==== Number and possession ====
Ho distinguishes singular, dual and plural numbers. Number suffixes are generally written separate from base nouns.

		Possessive
Singular	Kula "tiger"	Kulaaḱ "tiger's"
Dual	Kula kin "two tigers"	Kula kinaḱ "of the two tigers"
Plural	Kula ko "tigers"	Kula koaḱ "of the tigers"

==== Number and inalienable possession ====
Construction for alienable possessions is different from inalienable possessions, En Eraaḱ Kolom "That woman's threshing floor", and En Era Gauńte "That woman's aunt". Suffixes for inalienable possessions only occur in the singular.

		1st person possessor	2nd person possessor	3rd person possessor
Singular	Gauń "aunt"	Gauńiń "my aunt"	Gauńme "your aunt"	Gauńte "his/her aunt"
Dual	Gauń kin "two aunts"	Gauńiń tekin "my two aunts"	Gauńme tekin "your two aunts"	Gauńte tekin "his/her two aunts"
Plural	Gauń kin "two aunts"	Gauńiń teko "my aunts"	Gauńme teko "your aunts"	Gauńte teko "his/her aunts"

=== Pronouns ===
Ho personal pronoun distinguish inclusive and exclusive first person and anaphoric and demonstrative third person.

Personal pronouns
				Singular	Dual	Plural
1st person	Exclusive			ań	aliń	ale
1st person	Inclusive			ań	alaṅ	abu
2nd person				am	aben	ape
3rd person	Anaphoric			ać	akin	ako
3rd person	Demonstrative	Proximal		neić	nekin	neko
3rd person	Demonstrative	Distal	Visible	enić	enkin	enko
3rd person	Demonstrative	Distal	Audible	etić	etekin	eteko
3rd person	Demonstrative	Remote		hanić	hankin	hanko

Interrogative pronouns
	Animate	Inanimate
Referential	okoe	okon
Non-referential	cenić	cenaḱ

Indefinite pronouns
	Animate	Inanimate
'any'	jahć	jahnaḱ
'another'	eṭaḱć	eṭaḱaḱ

Demonstratives
	Simple	Particular
Proximate	ne, nen	nea, nena
Distal	en	ena
Remote	han	hana

=== Numerals ===
Short forms are used in compound words, general counting and counting money, the long forms are used when counting specific objects.

	Cardinal		Distributive	
	Short form	Long form	Short form	Long form
1	mí	miat́	mimit́	mí-miat́
2	bar	baria	bá-bar	bá-baria
3	apé	apeia	á-pé	á-peia
4	upun	upunia	ú-pun	ú-punia
5	moe	moeia	mó-moe	mó-móeia
6	turui	turuiia	tú-turui	tú-turuiia
7	ai	aiia	á-ai	á-aiia
8	iril	irilia	í-iril	í-irilia
9	are	areia	á-are	á-areia
10	gel	gelia	gé-gel	gé-gelia
20	hisi	hisiia	hí-hisi	hí-hisiia

=== Postpositions ===
Postposition	Function
lagit́	Dative
loḱ	Comitative, along with
paa	Towards, around
re	Spatio-temporal location, locative
paṅ	Temporal, indicates time
japaḱ	Near
te	Instrumental, instrument, cause, motion, direction, allative
leka	Semblative
taḱ	Adessive
aete	Ablative, source, origin
cetan	On top of
latar	Below
suba	Under
jóṅ, joka	Terminative
mutit́/partet́	Distributive

=== Particles ===
Particle	Function / Meaning	Examples
do	Topic marker	En Kaji do nahḱ at́ yna, 'That word is now forgotten'
ó	'Even/also'	En Kaji ó nahḱ do at́ yna, 'Even that word is forgotten now'
ge	Emphasis marker	En Kaji ge at́ yna, 'That very word is forgotten'
ci	Question particle	En Kaji at́ yna ci?, 'Has that word been forgotten?'
ma	'As for that'	En Kaji ma at́ yna nahḱ do, 'As for that word, it is lost now'
rená, rengá	Intensifier	En Kaji at́ rená/rengá yna, 'That word is absolutely forgotten'
toraṅ	Speculative	En Kaji do at́ yna toraṅ, 'That word is forgotten I suppose'
ciat́/cit́laṅ/cimat́	'As far as I know'	En Kaji do at́ yna cimat́, 'That word is forgotten (as far as I know)'
deraṅ	Hearsay	En Catom do at́ yna deraṅ, 'That umbrella was lost (they say)'
batit́/batit́laṅ/batikam/batil	Realization/correction particle	En Urić doć at́ yna batit́, 'That cow has gone missing (I just realized)'; Nen Urić batit́ at́ lena, 'It was this cow that was lost (not the other one, I was mistaken)'
honaṅ	Irrealis marker	En Kaji do at́ yna honaṅ, 'That word would have been forgotten'
auri	'Not yet'	En Kaji do auri at́oḱa, 'That word is yet to be forgotten'
gatát́/gatalt́	'All without exception'	Upun hoo gatát́/gatalt́kô at́ yna, 'All the four persons were lost'
jaket́/sante	'As far as even'	En Kaji jaket́/sante at́oḱ ge, 'To the extent that even that word may be forgotten'
mar	Prompt hearer to do something	En Merom mar kumbuu yna, 'That goat has been stolen (how disappointing, what would you even say to that?)'
halte	'So it was...'	Nen Seta halte at́ lena, 'So it was this dog that was lost'
idu	Dubitative	Nayl kale kumbuu kenakô menea, idu, 'They say we did not steal the plough (but who knows?)'
sumat́/sungat́/suat́/sual	'Only'	Nen Oaḱ sumat́ sareć yna, 'Only this house was spared'
cite	Disbelief	En cokoć lekan Oaḱ citekô kiriṅ ket́a?, 'Did they really buy this small house?'
oṛoḱ/onḍoḱ	'What else do you expect?'	Parkom do Gama rem bage let́a, soya yna oṛoḱ, You had left the cot in the rain, it started rotting, what else do you expect?
rongam/rongate	'I tell you / of course'	Kolom ren Guḍu rongam Bilae imineć maraṅa, 'The bandicoot rat from the threshing floor is big as a cat I tell you'

=== Verbs ===
There is no restrictions as to which word may occupy the role of a verb. Therefore, even proper nouns may act as verbs, Lako ket́ińako, 'They named me Lako'. Verbs may be serialized or modified with affixes before being put in this verb template:

Verb stem + (Aspect marker) + (Transitive/Intransitive marker) + (Object pronoun) + (Mood marker) + (Subject pronoun)

The verb stem may be modified in the following ways:

	Root modification	Example with kaji, 'to tell'
Reciprocal	-p-	kapaji, 'to tell each other / argue'
Benefactive	-va	kajiva, 'to tell someone'
Habitual	lengthening or reduplication of the first syllable	kaáji, 'to tell habitually'

Ho aspect markers
		Transitive	Intransitive	Examples with nutum, 'to name'
Past	Pluperfect	let́	len	nutum let́ań, 'I had previously named'; nutum lenań, 'I was previously named'
Past	Aorist	ket́	ken*	nutum ket́ań, 'I named'; nutum kenań, 'I used to name'
Past	Ingressive	**	yan***	nutum yanań, 'I had begun to be named / I was named'
Past	Perfect	akat́	akan	nutum akat́ań, 'I have named'; nutum akanań, 'I have been named (I'm famous)'
Non-past	Progressive/Continuous/Punctual	tat́	tan****	nutum tat́ań, 'I have (just) named'; nutumè tanań, 'I am naming it'
Non-past	Present/Future	-Ø	-oḱ	nuútumań, 'I name (habitually)'; nutumoḱań, 'I will be named'
Non-past		lee	leenoḱ	nutum leeań, 'I will first name it'; nutum leenoḱań 'I will first be famous'
Non-past		kee	keenoḱ	nutum keeań, 'I will name it (before doing something else)'
Non-past		akaa	akaanoḱ	nutum akaaàń, 'I will keep naming'; nutum akaanoḱań, 'I will continue to be named'
Non-past		taa	-	nutum taaàń, 'I will name it now'

- presence of a transitivity marker indicates past tense and the absence non-past.
- ken is only used in its original function as an intransitive with a small number of verbs, like oṛa 'to bathe' and sen 'to go', it has now been extended even to transitive verbs, where it shifts the focus from the object of the verb to the subject.
- intransitive counterpart of the ingressive yan is lost in Ho, while being maintained in Mundari as yada/jada and in Santali as eda. ean maintains ingressive meaning only with a limited number of verbs, it mostly functions as the intransitive counterpart of aorist ket́.
- tan is conjugated differently than other aspect markers, where the object marker occurs right before tan, rather than after the transitivity marker, enabling it to be used even on transitive verbs, where it has taken over the function of tat́ with many verbs, as in gama tat́ać vs. gamaè tanać, both having the same meaning with the latter being more common. With a number of transitive verbs, tan and tat́ contrast and produce progressive-continuous distinction, tusiṅ tat́ać, 'he is wearing' (continuous aspect), tusiṅè tanać, 'he (now) is (in the process of) wearing it' (progressive aspect).
- benefactive stem with -a cannot take any of the aspect markers, it can only take a transitivity marker, limiting its occurrence either with the past or the non-past tense.

== Vocabulary ==
Most of the Ho basic vocabulary is of Munda origin, with cognates in other Kherwarian languages, undated old borrowings from Indo-Aryan languages also exist, such as kolom, 'threasing floor', datarom 'a sickle', sutam 'a thread', gotom 'ghee' and parkom 'a cot'. In recent years, increased number of words from Hindi, English and Odia have been entering the language due to increased contact. Ho numbers are almost entirely out of practical use, being supplanted by Hindi numbers, except for one, two and three.

Ho lexicon reflects close association with nature, including numerous onomatopoeias arising from cries of different animals along with 'expressives' to describe sounds in nature.

Ho, like other Kherwarian languages, has lexical differentiation in many of its verbs, whereby different words exist to express distinctions within a single concept. For example, maḱ 'to cut with a striking motion', hat́ 'to cut with a sawing motion', ir 'to reap with a sickle', get́ 'to cut with cutting tool being stationary', paaḱ 'to split firewood with an axe', laṭaṕ 'to clip hair etc.', hese 'to clear branches etc. by cutting', banḍić 'to cut the extremities', topaṅ/tobaṅ 'to sever with a single striking motion', samaḱ 'to cut into small pieces'.

Many words are derived using affixes.

Affix	Examples
a-	nú 'to drink' → anu 'to cause/make to drink', jom 'to eat' → ajom 'to feed', kiriṅ → akiriṅ 'to cause to buy (to sell)', sen 'to walk' → asen 'to cause to walk (to help someone walk), to transport'
-n-	nel 'to see' → nenel 'a view, an opinion', duṕ 'to sit' → dunuṕ 'a meeting', saṕ 'to hold' → sanaṕ 'a handle', roḱ 'to carve' → ronoḱ 'a carving'
-p-	got́ 'to pluck' → gopot́ 'the petiole', kuli 'to ask' → kupuli 'to ask each other', kupul 'a relative', hon 'a child' → hopon 'descendants', seet́ 'son' → sepeet́ 'a youth'
-t-	numu 'a name' → nutum 'to name; a name', bor 'to pull out a string etc.' → botor 'a train of cloth etc.', aagom 'a levelling plank' → ataagom 'to level with a plank; a levelling plank'
-m-	hon 'son' → homon 'a woman's brother's son', hoo 'human' → homoo 'the body', laḱ 'to scrape' → lamaḱ 'the bean pod of a tree (used as a scraper)'
m-	arsal 'to shine light' → marsal 'light', raḱ 'to cry' → maraḱ 'a peacock'
-r-	oṅ 'to blow' → oroṅ 'to play a wind instrument', ugum 'hot and sultry' → urgum 'warm', kaji 'to say' → karji 'a messenger', akit́ 'to gather' → arkit́ 'to abduct', teteć 'moonlight' → terteć 'dim light'
r-	anjet́ 'to dry up' → ranjet́ 'to cause to dry up'
k-	eset́ 'to block' → keset́ 'to cause to block'

== Writing system ==
Ho has been written in various scripts, starting from the first written record of 1824 to the present day, mostly using the Latin alphabet, Devanagari, Odia and more recently using the Warang Chiti script. Most writing done in Jharkhand tends to use the Devanagari script, while in Odisha it is the Odia script. While community intellectuals have been promoting the usage of Warang Chiti, it is yet to be widely used among Ho people due to it not being a part of school education. In 1985, a committee consisting of intellectuals including Ram Dayal Munda and Bhagey Gobardhan deliberated on common script for Ho, and decided in favor of Warang Chiti, eliminating competition from scripts put forth by other inventors such as Sangram Sindhu's Owar Anka Gār Lipi, disseminated by an institution called Sindhu Jumur, Rohidas Singh Nag's Mundari Bani Hisir Champa, Raghunath Purty's Ho Ol Lipi, Purushottam Godsora's Srishti Lipi among others.

== Sample text ==
The following text is Article 1 of the Universal Declaration of Human Rights, written in Ho:

=== Warang Chiti script ===
𑣞𑣗𑣂𑣓 𑣖𑣁𑣓𑣖𑣂 𑣌𑣉𑣁𑣄 𑣙𑣂𑣅𑣁𑣕𑣂𑣊 𑣁𑣓‍𑣑𑣉𑣄 𑣈𑣌𑣕𑣂𑣅𑣜 𑣌𑣉 𑣜𑣈𑣅𑣄 𑣖𑣁𑣖𑣚𑣈 𑣜𑣈 𑣎𑣉𑣓𑣉𑣖𑣈𑣈 𑣕𑣈𑣋𑣈 𑣔𑣓𑣁𑣖𑣃𑣚 𑣁𑣓‍𑣑𑣉𑣄 𑣗𑣜𑣁𑣗𑣜𑣂 𑣜𑣈𑣅𑣄 𑣓𑣖𑣁 𑣌𑣓𑣁. 𑣂𑣓𑣂𑣌𑣃 𑣗𑣃𑣔‍𑣔𑣂 𑣁𑣓‍𑣑𑣉𑣄 𑣎𑣂𑣗𑣉𑣓 𑣗𑣂𑣕𑣜 𑣜𑣈𑣅𑣄 𑣈𑣓𑣈𑣖 𑣓𑣖𑣁 𑣌𑣓𑣁 𑣁𑣓‍𑣑𑣉𑣄 𑣁𑣌𑣉-𑣁𑣌𑣉 𑣜𑣈 𑣙𑣋𑣈𑣅𑣁-𑣗𑣉𑣙𑣅𑣁 (𑣗‍𑣙𑣁𑣆𑣏𑣁𑣜𑣈) 𑣜𑣈𑣅𑣄 𑣎𑣂𑣗𑣉𑣓 𑣃𑣊𑣃𑣄 𑣕𑣈𑣌𑣉 𑣎𑣁𑣓𑣁𑣋𑣜 𑣕𑣈𑣅𑣄 𑣔𑣉𑣜𑣌𑣜.

=== Devanagari ===
सबिन मानमि कोअः हियातिङ अन्डोः एकतियर को रेयः मामले रे जोनोमेए तेगे दनामुल अन्डोः बराबरि रेयः नमा कना। इनिकु बुद्दि अन्डोः जिबोन बितर रेयः एनेम नमा कना अन्डोः अको-अको रे हगेया-बोहया (भाईचारे) रेयः जिबोन उङुः तेको जानागर तेयः दोरकर॥

=== IPA transcription ===
sɐbin mʌnmi koɐː hijʌt̪iŋ ənɖoː ekt̪ijɐɾ ko ɾejɐː mʌmle re ɟonomeeː t̪eɡe d̪ɐnʌmul ənɖoː bɐɾɐbɐɾi ɾejɐː nɐmʌ kənʌ. iniku budwi ənɖoː ɟibon bit̪ɐɾ ɾejɐː enem nɐmʌ kənʌ ənɖoː ɐko ɐko ɾe hɐɡejʌ bohɐjʌ ɾejɐː ɟibon uɖuː t̪eko ɟʌnʌɡɐɾ t̪ejɐː doɾkɐr.

=== Alternative version (Ho Latin) ===
Honoo sanam raate anḍoḱ Tingunum· Tíjoṅ mipit́teko unduṕ akana. Urumsẽa· Jivmet́'ko emvan te, Hagaea Mepen loḱko ripika enaṅà.

=== IPA transcription ===
honoː sanam raːte anɖoʔ tiŋgunum tiːd͡ʑoŋ mipiˀt̚teko undubakana. urumsẽa jiːmeˀt̚ko eman te, hageja mepen loʔko ripikɛ enaŋaʔ.

=== English ===
All human beings are born free and equal in dignity and rights. They are endowed with reason and conscience and should act towards one another in a spirit of brotherhood.

== Usage ==
Under the Multilingual Education (MLE) programme, Odisha government has been providing primary education in Ho speaking areas.

National Eligibility Test conducted by the University Grants Commission of India includes Ho literature along with literature from other tribal languages under Tribal and Regional Language/Literature subject. In Odisha and Jharkhand, Education in Ho at the primary level was introduced in 20 and 449 schools respectively and about 44,502 tribal students are pursuing their studies in the language.

For the past few years, All India Radio (AIR) has been airing Ho programs from centres in Keonjhar, Rourkela and Cuttack besides Baripada in Mayurbhanj. Regular programs in Ho are broadcast from Chaibasa and Jamshedpur AIR centres. Similarly, regional news bulletins are broadcast two days a week from AIR Ranchi.

=== Universities ===
The following universities offer courses on Ho:

- Ranchi University, Ranchi, Jharkhand
- Kolhan University, Chaibasa, Jharkhand

=== Educational institutions ===
The following educational institutions offer courses on Ho:

- Ho Language Education Council, Thakurmunda, Mayurbhanj, Odisha
- Ho Language +2 Junior College, Thakurmunda, Mayurbhanj, Odisha
- Kolguru Lako Bodra Ho Language High school, Birbasa, Bhubaneswar, Odisha
- Banajyoti Bahubhasi Vidya Mandir, Purunapai, Deogorh, Odisha
- Veer Birsa Warangchity Mondo, Rairangpur, Mayurbhanj, Odisha
- Birsa Munda Ho Language High school, Jamunalia, Keonjhar, Odisha
- Padmashree Tulasi Munda Ho Language High School, Machhgorh, Keonjhar, Odisha
- Kol guru Lako Bodra Ho Language High School, Dobati, Balasore, Odisha
- Birsa Munda Ho Language High School, Nuagaon, Mayurbhanj, Odisha
- Atteh Turtung Rumtulay mondo, singda, Mayurbhanj, Odisha
- Bankipirh Marshal Mondo, Bankidihi, Mayurbhanj, Odisha
- Similipal Baa bagan mondo, Thakurmapatna, Mayurbhanj, Odisha
- Kolguru Lako Bodra Ho Language High School, Gokul Chandra pur, Mayurbhanj, Odisha
- Birsa Munda Ho Language High School, Hadagutu, Mayurbhanj, Odisha
- Kolhan High School, Satakosia, Mayurbhanj, Odisha
- Guru Lako Bodra Ho Language High School, Thakurmunda, Mayurbhanj, Odisha
- Ho Hayam Seyannoh Moond, Madkamhatu, Mayurbhanj, Odisha
- Sitadevi Warang chiti(𑢹𑣗𑣁𑣜𑣊 𑢯𑣂𑣕𑣂) Moond, Khunta, Mayurbhanj, Odisha
- P.C.Haibru Warang chiti(𑢹𑣗𑣁𑣜𑣊 𑢯𑣂𑣕𑣂) School, Kadadiha, Mayurbhanj, Odisha

== Literature ==
- Ho folk literature's collection of folk songs by Sharatchandra Rai, Dr. D.N. Majumdar, B. Sukumar, Haldhaar, Kanhuram Devgum etc. (1915–26).
- Tuturd, Sayan Marsal by Dr. S.K. Tiyu.
- The Affairs of a Tribe by Dr. D.N. Majumdaar.
- Aandi and Sarjom Ba Dumba by Jaidev Das.
- Ho Durang by W.G. Archer.
- Folklore of Kolhaan by C.H. Bompaas.
- Sengail (Poems), Satish Rumul (Poems), Ho Chapakarh Kahin, Satish Chandra Sanhita, and Chaas Raiy Takh by Satish Kumar Koda.
- Dishum Rumul Mage Durudh by Shivcharan Birua.
- Adivasi Sivil Durang, Adivasi Deyoan, Adivasi Muni and Urri Keda Kova Red-Ranu by Durga Purti.
- Bonga Buru Ko (Ho Religion), Horoh Hoan Ko, Maradh Bonga, and Gosain-Devgum Mage Poraab (on Maage Parv) by Pradhan Gagrai.
- Warangchiti (on 𑢹𑣗𑣁𑣜𑣊 𑢯𑣂𑣕𑣂), Pompo, Shaar Hora 1-7 (Play), Raghuvansh (Play), Kol ruul(Hindi and Ho(𑢹𑣗𑣁𑣜𑣊 𑢯𑣂𑣕𑣂), Homoyom pitika, Hora-Bara, Ho Hayam paam puti, Halang halpung, Ela ol itu ute, Jiboan * * Gumpai Durang, Baa buru Bonga buru and Bonga Singirai (Novel) by Ot Guru Kol Lako Bodra.
- Ho Kudih (Novel) by Dumbi Ho.
- Ho Kudih (Novel) and Adhunik Ho Shishth Kawya by Prof. Janum Singh Soy.
- Jaira Jeebon Dastur, Durrn Dudugar, and Ho Bhasha Shastra Ayun Vyakaran by Prof. Balram Paat Pingua.
- Ho Dishum Ho Hoon Ko by Dhanusingh Purti.
- Eitaa Bataa Nalaa Basaa, Joaur, Parem Sanadh (Poems), Sarjom Ba Taral, etc. By Kamal Lochan Kohaar.
- Ho Lokkatha by Dr. Aditya Prasad Sinha.
- Magazines like Johar, Turturd, Ottoroad, and Sarnaphool also have Ho language articles.
- Ho Language Digital Journal "Diyang"
- Ho Language monthly journal"Dostur Korang"by Kairasingh Bandiya
- Ho Kaboy (Poem) poti "Tangi Meyanj Sorogo Kore" by Ghanshyam Bodra
- Ho language song"Dureng Dala"by Dibakar Soy
- Ho language learning books "Ol initu" and "Mage Porob"by Kairasingh Bandiya"
- Ho hayam sibil dureng(Ho and Hindi) by Doboro Buliuli

== Demand for inclusion in the Eighth Schedule ==
Apart from the Ho peoples themselves, the governments of Odisha and Jharkhand have been making demands for Ho to be included in the Eighth Schedule to the Constitution of India. Rajya Sabha member and Union Petroleum and Steel Minister Dharmendra Pradhan had also submitted a memorandum demanding that the Government of India include Ho in the Constitution to give it an official status.The same request has also been made by the Department of Personnel, Jharkhand. Former Home Minister Rajnath Singh had assured that Ho would be included in the eighth schedule, said union minister Dharmendra Pradhan.

Erstwhile Jharkhand Chief Minister Hemant Soren has written to the Home Ministry for the inclusion of Ho into the Eighth Schedule of the Indian Constitution.

== See also ==
- Languages of India
- Languages with official status in India
