= List of Adivasis =

Following is a list of notable Adivasi people organised by profession, field, or focus.

== Academics ==
- Lako Bodra, Warang Kshiti script creator, writer and activist
- Motiravan Kangali, linguist
- Sonajharia Minz, Computer Scientist
- Javaid Rahi , Tribal Researcher and writer
- Ramke W. Momin, educationist and philosopher
- Naresh Chandra Murmu
- Raghunath Murmu, Ol Chiki script creator, writer and activist
- Rohidas Singh Nag, Mundari Bani script creator and linguist
- Boa Sr

== Literature ==
- Temsula Ao, poet and writer
- Turia Chand Baskey, writer
- Javaid Rahi , Tribal Researcher and writer
- Damayanti Beshra, writer and Padma Shri awardee
- Shyam Sundar Besra, writer
- Rupnath Brahma, poet
- Mamang Dai, journalist, author and former civil servant
- Alice Ekka, writer
- Gangadhar Hansda, writer and poet
- Rupchand Hansda, writer
- Suchitra Hansda, writer
- Salge Hansdah, writer
- Arjun Charan Hembram, writer
- Kali Charan Hembram, writer
- Shyam Sundar Hembram, writer and educator
- Rose Kerketta, writer
- Anjali Kisku, writer
- Jamadar Kisku, writer
- Sarada Prasad Kisku, writer
- Somai Kisku, writer
- Grace Kujur, poet
- Anuj Lugun, poet and writer
- Ghasi Ram Mahli, poet
- Gobinda Chandra Majhi, writer
- Aditya Kumar Mandi, writer
- Ram Dayal Munda, scholar, artist and Padma Sri awardee
- Joba Murmu, writer
- Rabindranath Murmu, writer
- Rani Murmu, writer
- Sadhu Ramchand Murmu, poet and writer
- Thakur Prasad Murmu, writer
- Haldhar Nag, writer
- Hansda Sowvendra Shekhar, writer
- Gomasta Prasad Soren, writer
- Kherwal Soren, writer
- Bapi Tudu, writer
- Maina Tudu, writer
- Majhi Ramdas Tudu, writer
- Rabilal Tudu, writer
- Tala Tudu, writer

== Activists ==
- Dayamani Barla, activist
- Padala Bhudevi, activist
- Gladson Dungdung, activist
- Tulsi Gowda, environmentalist
- Digamber Hansda, activist
- C K Janu, activist
- Tulasi Munda, activist
- Chami Murmu, environmental activist
- Simon Oraon, environmental activist and Padma Shri awardee
- Gyarsi Bai Sahariya, activist
- Sushila Samad, activist
- Dinesh Chand Meena , activist and Social Worker
- Archana Soreng, environmental activist
- Silverine Swer, activist and Padma Shri awardee
- Jamuna Tudu, environmental activist
- Abhay Xaxa (1983–2020), Human rights activist, poet and anthropologist

== Politicians ==
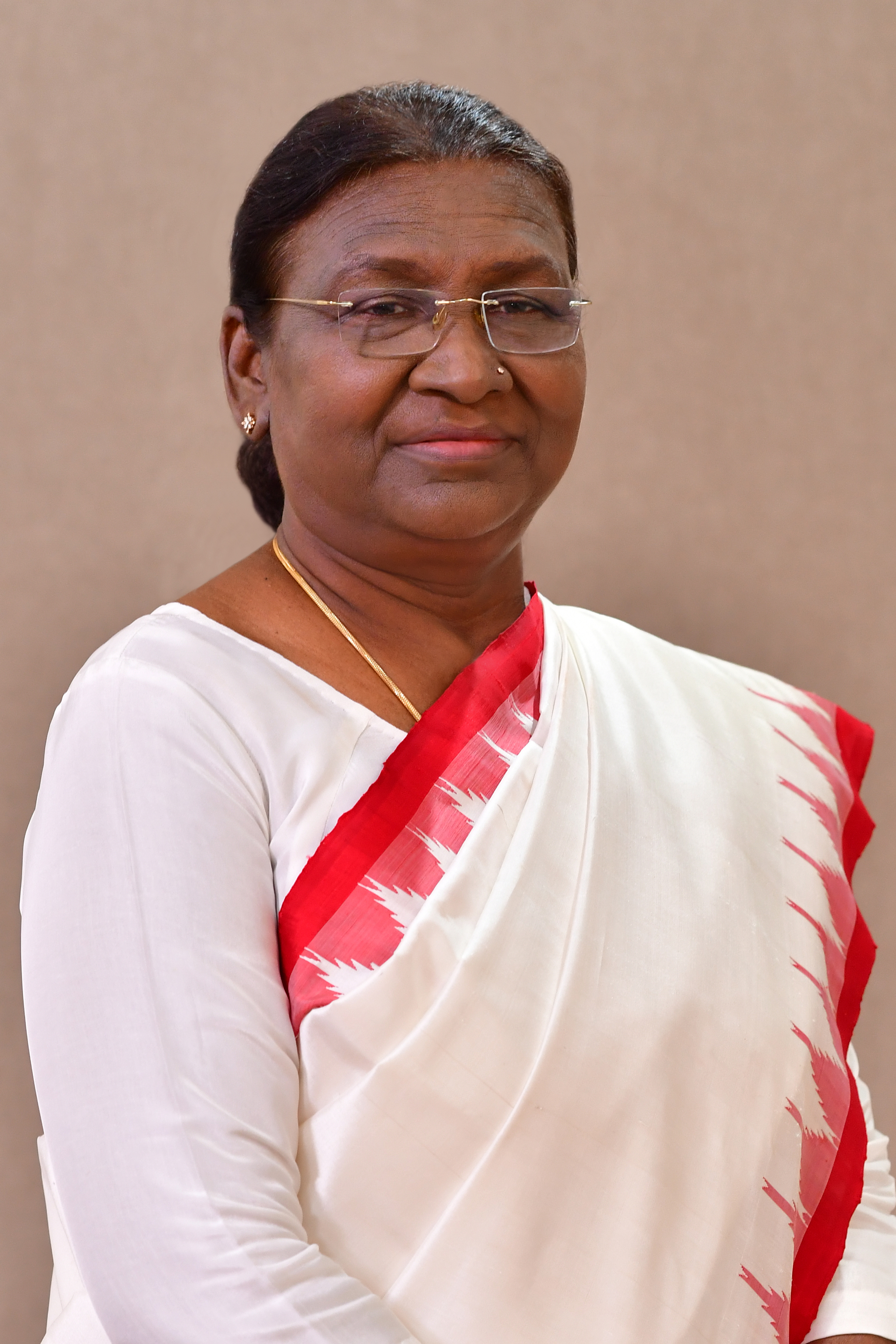
Draupadi Murmu

=== Presidents ===
- Draupadi Murmu, 15th President of India

=== Governors ===
- Urmila Singh, Ex Governor of Himachal Pradesh & Goa.

=== Chief Ministers ===
- P. Shilu Ao, former Chief Minister of Nagaland
- Gegong Apang, former Chief Minister of Arunachal Pradesh
- Hemananda Biswal, former Chief Minister of Odisha
- Amarsinh Chaudhary, former Chief Minister of Gujarat
- K. L. Chishi, former Chief Minister of Nagaland
- Dasarath Deb, former Chief Minister of Tripura
- Kazi Lhendup Dorjee, former Chief Minister of Sikkim
- Giridhar Gamang, former Chief Minister of Odisha
- Jarbom Gamlin, former Chief Minister of Arunachal Pradesh
- S. C. Jamir, former Chief Minister of Nagaland, former Governor of Maharashtra, Gujarat, Goa, Odisha and Padma Bhushan awardee
- John Bosco Jasokie, former Chief Minister of Nagaland
- Rishang Keishing, former Chief Minister of Manipur
- Dorjee Khandu, former Chief Minister of Arunachal Pradesh
- Pema Khandu, current Chief Minister of Arunachal Pradesh
- Flinder Anderson Khonglam, former Chief Minister of Meghalaya
- Madhu Koda, former Chief Minister of Jharkhand
- Vizol Koso, former Chief Minister of Nagaland
- D. D. Lapang, former Chief Minister of Meghalaya
- Shürhozelie Liezietsu, former Chief Minister of Nagaland
- B. B. Lyngdoh, former Chief Minister of Meghalaya
- Mohan Charan Majhi, current Chief Minister of Odisha
- S. C. Marak, former Chief Minister of Meghalaya
- Babulal Marandi, former Chief Minister of Jharkhand
- E. K. Mawlong, former Chief Minister of Meghalaya
- Arjun Munda, former Chief Minister of Jharkhand, former Minister of Tribal Affairs and Minister of Agriculture and Farmers' Welfare
- Thepfülo-u Nakhro, former Chief Minister of Nagaland
- Vamüzo Phesao, former Chief Minister of Nagaland
- Darwin Diengdoh Pugh, former Chief Minister of Meghalaya
- Kalikho Pul, former Chief Minister of Arunachal Pradesh
- Neiphiu Rio, current Chief Minister of Nagaland
- Donkupar Roy, former Chief Minister of Meghalaya
- J. D. Rymbai, former Chief Minister of Meghalaya
- Vishnu Deo Sai, current Chief Minister of Chhattisgarh
- Conrad Sangma, current Chief Minister of Meghalaya
- Mukul Sangma, former Chief Minister of Meghalaya
- P. A. Sangma, former Chief Minister of Meghalaya
- Williamson A. Sangma, former Chief Minister of Meghalaya
- Hokishe Sema, former Chief Minister of Nagaland
- Yangmaso Shaiza, former Chief Minister of Manipur
- Nareshchandra Singh, former Chief Minister of Madhya Pradesh
- Champai Soren, former Chief Minister of Jharkhand
- Hemant Soren, current Chief Minister of Jharkhand
- Shibu Soren, former Chief Minister of Jharkhand and current Member of Rajya Sabha
- Nabam Tuki, former Chief Minister of Arunachal Pradesh
- T. R. Zeliang, former Chief Minister of Nagaland
- Zoramthanga, former Chief Minister of Mizoram

=== Politicians ===
- Temjen Imna Along, politician
- Debananda Amat, politician
- Purna Chandra Baka, politician
- Pradeep Kumar Balmuchu, politician
- Bhushan Bara, politician
- Bulu Chik Baraik, politician
- John Barla, politician
- Kirit Bikram Kishore Deb Barman, 185th Maharaja of Tripura and politician
- Pulin Bihari Baske, politician
- Yadunath Baskey, politician
- Dharanidhor Basumatari, politician
- Joachim Baxla, politician
- Ignace Beck, politician
- Devidhan Besra, politician
- Satya Chandra Besra, politician
- Surya Singh Besra, politician
- Dukha Bhagat, politician
- Indra Nath Bhagat, politician
- Kamal Kishore Bhagat, politician
- Sudarshan Bhagat, politician
- Sukhdeo Bhagat, politician
- Heerji Bhai, politician
- Narsing Bhatra, politician
- Rupu Bhatra, politician
- Lakhmu Bhawani, politician
- Puna Bhengra, politician
- Bhabani Shankar Bhoi, politician
- Kantilal Bhuria, tribal rights activist and former Union Cabinet Minister of Tribal Affairs, Agriculture & Food
- Deepak Birua, politician
- Kolai Birua, politician
- Harishankar Brahma, former Chief Election Commissioner of India
- Amit Kumar Chakma, politician
- Buddha Dhan Chakma, politician
- Kristo Mohan Chakma, politician
- Mohan Lal Chakma, politician
- Nihar Kanti Chakma, politician,
- Nirupam Chakma, politician
- Prova Chakma, politician
- Rasik Mohan Chakma, politician
- Sambhu Lal Chakma, politician
- Santana Chakma, politician
- Wilson Champramary, politician
- Kalo Chandramani, politician
- Bharat Singh Chowhan, politician
- Amar Singh Damar, politician
- Martin Danggo, politician
- Janardan Dehury, politician
- Mohanbhai Sanjibhai Delkar, tribal leader of Southern part of Gujarat
- Kishore Chandra Deo, tribal rights activist and former Union Cabinet Minister of Tribal Affairs, Steel & Mines
- Jamuna Devi, former Deputy Chief Minister of Madhya Pradesh
- Rajni Devi, politician
- Arabinda Dhali, politician
- Padmini Dian, politician
- Pradip Kumar Dishari, politician
- Anosh Ekka, politician
- C. S. Raazen Ekka, politician
- Christopher Ekka, politician
- Dashrath Gagrai, politician
- Giridhar Gamang, politician
- Hema Gamang, politician
- Tukaram Huraji Gavit, politician
- Kothapalli Geetha, politician
- Laxman Giluwa, politician
- Bhagey Gobardhan, politician
- Shambhu Charan Godsora, politician
- Bhagirathi Gomango, politician
- Dasarathi Gomango, politician
- Raghunath Gomango, politician
- Satyajeet Gomango, politician
- Nityananda Gond, politician
- Padma Charan Haiburu, politician
- Bachchu Hansda, politician
- Birbaha Hansda, politician
- Chunibala Hansda, politician
- Debnath Hansda, politician
- Kamalakanta Hansda, politician
- Matilal Hansda, politician
- Naren Hansda, politician
- Subodh Chandra Hansda, politician
- Sukumar Hansda, politician
- Thomas Hansda, politician
- Bhadav Hansdah, politician
- Rama Chandra Hansdah, politician
- Vijay Kumar Hansdak, politician
- Paokai Haokip, politician
- Basanti Hembram, politician
- Bateshwar Hembram, politician
- Deblina Hembram, politician
- Kunar Hembram, politician
- Sarojini Hembram, politician
- Seth Hembram, politician
- Sweety Sima Hembram, politician
- Lobin Hembrom, politician
- Putkar Hembrom, politician
- Jhina Hikaka, politician
- Nilamadhab Hikaka, politician
- Lal Bihari Himirika, politician
- Jiga Susaran Horo, politician
- Niral Enem Horo, politician
- Hoover Hynniewta, politician
- Soyam Joga, politician
- Rajesh Kachhap, politician
- Rama Chandra Kadam, politician
- Zamru Manglu Kahandole, politician
- Angada Kanhar, politician
- Chakramani Kanhar, politician
- Mahendra Karma, politician
- Rishang Keishing, politician
- Sushila Kerketta, member of the 14th Lok Sabha of India
- Bonily Khongmen, politician
- Mangu Khilla, politician
- Ganesh Ram Singh Khuntia, politician
- Mangala Kisan, politician
- Amiya Kumar Kisku, politician
- Choton Kisku, politician
- Jadunath Kisku, politician
- Prithvi Chand Kisku, politician
- Surti Kistaiya, politician
- Geeta Koda, politician
- Naman Bixal Kongari, politician
- Gangotri Kujur, politician
- James Kujur, politician
- Maurice Kujur, politician
- Girja Kumari, politician
- Manish Kunjam, politician
- Sawna Lakra, politician
- Kawasi Lakhma, politician
- Ratan Lal, politician
- Lalthanhawla, politician
- Bishal Lama, politician
- Jyotirindra Bodhipriya Larma, politician
- Chamra Linda, politician
- James Michael Lyngdoh, former Chief Election Commissioner of India
- Goddeti Madhavi, politician
- Bhaskar Madhei, politician
- Aditya Madhi, politician
- Mamta Madhi, politician
- Narasinga Madkami, politician
- Bhujabal Majhi, politician
- Chaitanya Prasad Majhi, politician
- Gajadhar Majhi, politician
- Gouri Shankar Majhi, politician
- Joba Majhi, politician
- Kumar Majhi, politician
- Mahendra Majhi, politician
- Naba Charan Majhi, politician
- Prakash Chandra Majhi, politician
- Ram Chandra Majhi, politician
- Ramesh Chandra Majhi, politician
- Tika Ram Majhi, politician
- Kavitha Maloth, politician
- Jyotsna Mandi, politician
- S. C. Marak, politician
- Sanford Marak, politician
- Iswar Marandi, politician
- Krishna Marandi, politician
- Louis Marandi, politician
- Simon Marandi, politician
- Som Marandi, politician
- Stephen Marandi, politician
- Tala Marandi, politician
- Selku Mardi, politician
- Sananda Marndi, politician
- Sudam Marndi, politician
- Matcharasa Matcharaju, politician
- Arjunlal Meena, politician
- Dhuleshwar Meena, politician
- Harish Meena, politician
- Jaskaur Meena, politician
- Kirodi Lal Meena, politician
- Laljibhai Meena, politician
- Murari Lal Meena, politician
- Raghuveer Meena, politician
- Numal Momin, politician
- Makaranda Muduli, politician
- Yashwantrao Martandrao Mukne, Koli Maharaja of Jawhar State, a flight lieutenant in the Royal Indian Air Force and politician
- Govind Chandra Munda, politician
- Jaipal Singh Munda, member of the Constituent Assembly which debated on the new Constitution of the Indian Union
- Joseph Munda, politician
- Kali Charan Munda, politician
- Kariya Munda, former Deputy Speaker, 15th Lok Sabha
- Koche Munda, politician
- Laxman Munda, politician
- Nilkanth Singh Munda, politician
- Sukra Munda, politician
- Vikash Kumar Munda, politician
- David Munzni, politician
- Anthony Murmu, politician
- Budhan Murmu, politician
- Dulal Murmu, politician
- Durga Murmu, politician
- Hemlal Murmu, politician
- Joyel Murmu, politician
- Khagen Murmu, politician
- Mrityunjoy Murmu, politician
- Paika Murmu, politician
- Paresh Murmu, politician
- Rupchand Murmu, politician
- Salkhan Murmu, politician
- Sanjali Murmu, politician
- Sarkar Murmu, politician
- Sidha Lal Murmu, politician
- Akhila Chandra Naik, politician
- Balram Naik, politician
- Fakir Mohan Naik, politician
- Gourahari Naik, politician
- Gurucharan Naik, politician
- Hrushikesh Naik, politician
- Jagannath Naik, politician
- Jalen Naik, politician
- Jogendra Naik, politician
- Maheswar Naik, politician
- Rabi Narayan Naik, politician
- Sambhunath Naik, politician
- Sitaram Naik, politician
- Subarna Naik, politician
- Premananda Nayak, politician
- Ramvichar Netam, politician
- Sayeedullah Nongrum, politician
- Jual Oram, politician
- Shankar Oram, politician
- Dinesh Oraon, politician
- Kartik Oraon, politician
- Lalit Oraon, politician
- Laloo Oraon, politician
- Manoj Kumar Oraon, politician
- Rameshwar Oraon, politician
- Shivshankar Oraon, politician
- Subodh Oraon, politician
- Sukhram Oraon, politician
- Sumati Oraon, politician
- Pitam Padhi, politician
- Vincent Pala, former Union Minister of Water Resources
- Bhogilal Pandya, freedom fighter and politician
- Jayaram Pangi, politician
- Kanjibhai Patel, politician
- Nanubhai Patel, politician
- Zapu Phizo, politician
- Ajayanti Pradhan, politician
- Jacob Pradhan, politician
- Nagarjuna Pradhan, politician
- Prafulla Chandra Pradhan, politician
- Saluga Pradhan, politician
- Vimla Pradhan, politician
- Sadasiva Pradhani, politician
- Moran Singh Purty, politician
- Niral Purty, politician
- Datla Satyanarayana Raju, politician
- Manohar Randhari, politician
- Gumma Thanuja Rani, politician
- B. Radhabai Ananda Rao, politician
- Manna Lal Rawat, politician
- Rajkumar Roat, politician
- James Joy Mohan Nichols Roy, freedom fighter and member of the Constituent Assembly of India
- Toyaka Sanganna, politician
- Agatha Sangma, politician
- James Sangma, politician
- Jagannath Saraka, politician
- Amulya Sardar, politician
- Hari Ram Sardar, politician
- Maneka Sardar, politician
- Sanatan Sardar, politician
- Sanjib Sardar, politician
- Rajib Lochan Saren, politician
- Uma Saren, politician
- Pabitra Saunta, politician
- Muhammed Hamdulla Sayeed, politician
- Padanatha Mohammed Sayeed, politician
- Timothy Shira, politician
- Babu Nath Singh, politician
- Birabhadra Singh, politician
- Harikrishna Singh, politician
- Jogesh Kumar Singh, politician
- Ramchandra Singh, politician
- Chandra Mohan Sinha, politician
- Chitrasen Sinku, politician
- Sona Ram Sinku, politician
- Dambaru Sisa, politician
- Basant Soren, politician
- Debi Soren, politician
- Durga Soren, politician
- Kalipada Soren, politician
- Kalpana Soren, politician
- Nalin Soren, politician
- Paul Jujhar Soren, politician
- Prakash Soren, politician
- Ramdas Soren, politician
- Sita Soren, politician
- Sunaram Soren, politician
- Sunil Soren, politician
- Soni Sori, political activist
- Hari Charan Soy, politician
- Vijay Singh Soy, politician
- Rungsung Suisa, politician
- Bagun Sumbrai, politician
- Kadraka Appala Swamy, politician
- George Gilbert Swell, former Deputy Speaker of the Lok Sabha and Ambassador to Norway and Burma
- Kusum Tete, politician
- Manoj Tigga, politician
- Simon Tigga, politician
- Sushila Tiriya, politician
- Bandhu Tirkey, politician
- Bhushan Tirkey, politician
- Dasrath Tirkey, politician
- Manohar Tirkey, politician
- Pius Tirkey, politician
- Rohit Joseph Tirkey, politician
- Shilpi Neha Tirkey, politician
- Sunil Chandra Tirkey, politician
- Frida Topno, politician
- Jay Prakash Toppo, politician
- Bishweswar Tudu, politician
- Budhrai Tudu, politician
- Laxman Tudu, politician
- Manmohan Tudu, politician
- Sandhya Rani Tudu, politician
- Mangru Ganu Uikey, politician
- Mangala Kisan,politician
- Ramachandra Ulaka, politician
- Saptagiri Sankar Ulaka, politician
- Neiliezhü Üsou, politician
- Laxman Vedu Valvi, politician
- Richard Vanlalhmangaiha, politician
- Chhotubhai Vasava, politician
- Kottagulli Chitti Naidu , politician
- Matcharasa Balaraju , politician
- Matcharasa Matcharaju , politician
- Gam Mallu dora , politician
- Giddi Eswari , politician
- Matyarasa visweswararaju , politician

== Independence movement ==
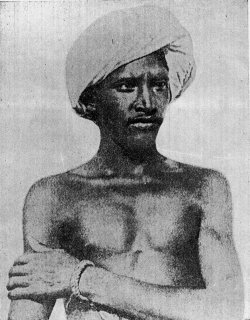
Bhagwan Birsa Munda

- Budhu Bhagat
- Jatra Bhagat
- Bapuji Bhangare
- Raghoji Bhangare
- Ramji Bhangare
- Komaram Bheem
- Tantia Bhil
- Thalakkal Chanthu
- Gunda Dhur
- Rani Gaidinliu
- Ramji Gond
- Haipou Jadonang
- Telanga Kharia
- Jirpa Laya
- Tilka Manjhi
- Birsa Munda
- Nirmal Munda
- Sidhu and Kanhu Murmu
- Dharanidhar Naik
- U Kiang Nangbah
- Bhima Nayak
- Laxman Nayak
- Jagannath Singh Patar
- Nilamber and Pitamber
- Alluri Sitarama Raju
- Baburao Shedmake
- Pa Togan Sangma
- Shankar Shah
- Rani Shiromani
- Tirot Sing
- Durjan Singh
- Ganga Narayan Singh
- Karunakar Singh
- Raghunath Singh
- Subal Singh
- Veer Narayan Singh
- Bajal Soren

== Art ==
- Bhuri Bai
- Lado Bai
- Jodhaiya Bai Baiga
- Bhajju Shyam
- Jangarh Singh Shyam
- Venkat Shyam
- Durga Bai Vyam

== Music and Dance ==
- Norden Tenzing Bhutia, musician, composer and singer
- Madhu Mansuri Hasmukh, singer and Padma Shri awardee
- Rathin Kisku, singer
- Gambhir Singh Mura, Chhau dancer and Padma Shri awardee
- Neil Nongkynrih, concert pianist, director of the Shillong Chamber Choir and Padma Shri awardee
- Kanaka Raju, Gussadi dancer and Padma Shri awardee
- Skendrowell Syiemlieh, folk singer and Padma Shri awardee

== Cinema ==
- Samten Bhutia, director and writer
- Lipika Singh Darai, filmmaker
- Danny Denzongpa, Bollywood actor
- Biju Toppo, filmmaker

== Sports ==
- Talimeren Ao, footballer
- Sanjay Balmuchu, footballer
- Lazarus Barla, hockey player
- Punam Barla, hockey player
- Nitin Bhille, cricketer
- Baichung Bhutia, former Indian football team captain
- Karma Bhutia, cricketer
- Kunzang Bhutia, footballer
- Mandup Bhutia, cricketer
- Nadong Bhutia, footballer
- Namgyal Bhutia, footballer
- Lako Phuti Bhutia, footballer
- Rinzing Bhutia, cricketer
- Sonam Bhutia, footballer
- Thupden Bhutia, footballer
- Tshering Bhutia, cricketer
- Durga Boro, footballer
- Pem Dorji, footballer
- Sylvanus Dung Dung, hockey player
- Deep Grace Ekka, hockey player
- Asha Gond, skateboarder
- Thonakal Gopi, Marathon
- Purnima Hembram, athlete
- Michael Kindo, hockey player and Arjuna awardee
- MC Mary Kom, boxer
- Jyoti Sunita Kullu, hockey player
- Birendra Lakra, hockey player
- Bimal Lakra, hockey player
- Birendra Lakra, hockey player
- Provat Lakra, footballer
- Sunita Lakra, hockey player
- Jeje Lalpekhlua, footballer
- Lalremsiami – hockey player
- Munmun Lugun, footballer
- Laxmirani Majhi, archer
- Shylo Malsawmtluanga, footballer
- Lilima Minz, hockey player
- Jaipal Singh Munda, former Indian Hockey team captain, politician and Member of the Constituent Assembly of India
- Manisa Panna, footballer
- Nikki Pradhan, hockey player
- Malavath Purna, mountaineer
- Lalrindika Ralte, footballer
- Limba Ram, archer
- Kavita Raut, athlete
- Amit Rohidas, hockey player
- Gilbertson Sangma, footballer
- Binita Soren, mountaineer
- Selay Soy, boxer
- Masira Surin, hockey player
- Namita Toppo, hockey player
- Salima Tete, hockey player
- Sumrai Tete, hockey player and Dhyan Chand Award awardee
- Dilip Tirkey, former Indian hockey team captain
- Ignace Tirkey, hockey player
- Prabodh Tirkey, hockey player
- Rupa Rani Tirkey, lawn bowler
- Manohar Topno, hockey player
- Binita Toppo, hockey player
- Namita Toppo, hockey player
- William Xalco, hockey player
- Pyari Xaxa, footballer

== Administration ==
- Amrit Lugun, IFS
- G C Murmu, IAS
- Armstrong Pame, IAS
- David R. Syiemlieh, former chairman (UPSC)
- Rajeev Topno, IAS

== Military ==
- Albert Ekka, awarded India's highest military award, the Param Vir Chakra

== Religious reformer ==
- Bhima Bhoi
- Kalicharan Brahma

== Advocates ==
- Anand Kumar Kujur, High Court of Chhattisgarh & Supreme court of India (Advocate)
- Sunit Kumar Toppo, Supreme court of India & High Court of Chhattisgarh (Advocate)

== See also ==
- Adivasi
- List of Scheduled Tribes
