= Santali literature =

Literary works in the Santali language

Santali literature (Santali: ᱥᱟᱱᱛᱟᱲᱤ ᱥᱟᱶᱦᱮᱫ) refers to the literary works written in the Santali language, primarily spoken by the Santal people of India, Bangladesh, Nepal, and Bhutan. It is one of the 22 scheduled languages of India and is written in the indigenous script called Ol Chiki script. Santali literature is composed in two broad styles- ᱠᱟᱹᱛᱷᱱᱤ (Kạthni-prose), ᱜᱟᱹᱛᱷᱱᱤ (Gạthni-poetry).In terms of historical development, it is broadly classified into two prominent forms (genres) based on historical passes. They are:

- Rar Sāṅhed (ᱨᱚᱲ ᱥᱟᱶᱦᱮᱫ) – before and including 18th century CE. This period was marked by poems and stories extolling oral literature.
- Al Sāṅhed (ᱚᱞ ᱥᱟᱶᱦᱮᱫ) – from 19th century onwards. This era is known for its vibrant literary works and creative writing.

The Santali Latin alphabet was created in the 1890s by the Norwegian missionary Paul Olaf Bodding. It is still used by some Santhals, particularly the members of the Northern Evangelical Lutheran Church (NELC). The Ol Chiki script was invented in 1925 by Pandit Raghunath Murmu.

== Historical development ==
The roots of Santali literature can be traced back to ancient times when it was primarily oral. The Santal community has a rich tradition of oral literature, including folk tales, songs, and myths, passed down through generations. The earliest known written works in Santali date back to the late 19th and early 20th centuries, with the efforts of Christian missionaries and Santal intellectuals.

== Early influences ==
The Christian missionaries played a significant role in the development of written Santali literature. The first Santali translation of the Bible was published in 1895 by Lars Olsen Skrefsrud, a Norwegian missionary. Following this, several other missionaries and Santal scholars contributed to the development of Santali literature.

== Literary forms ==
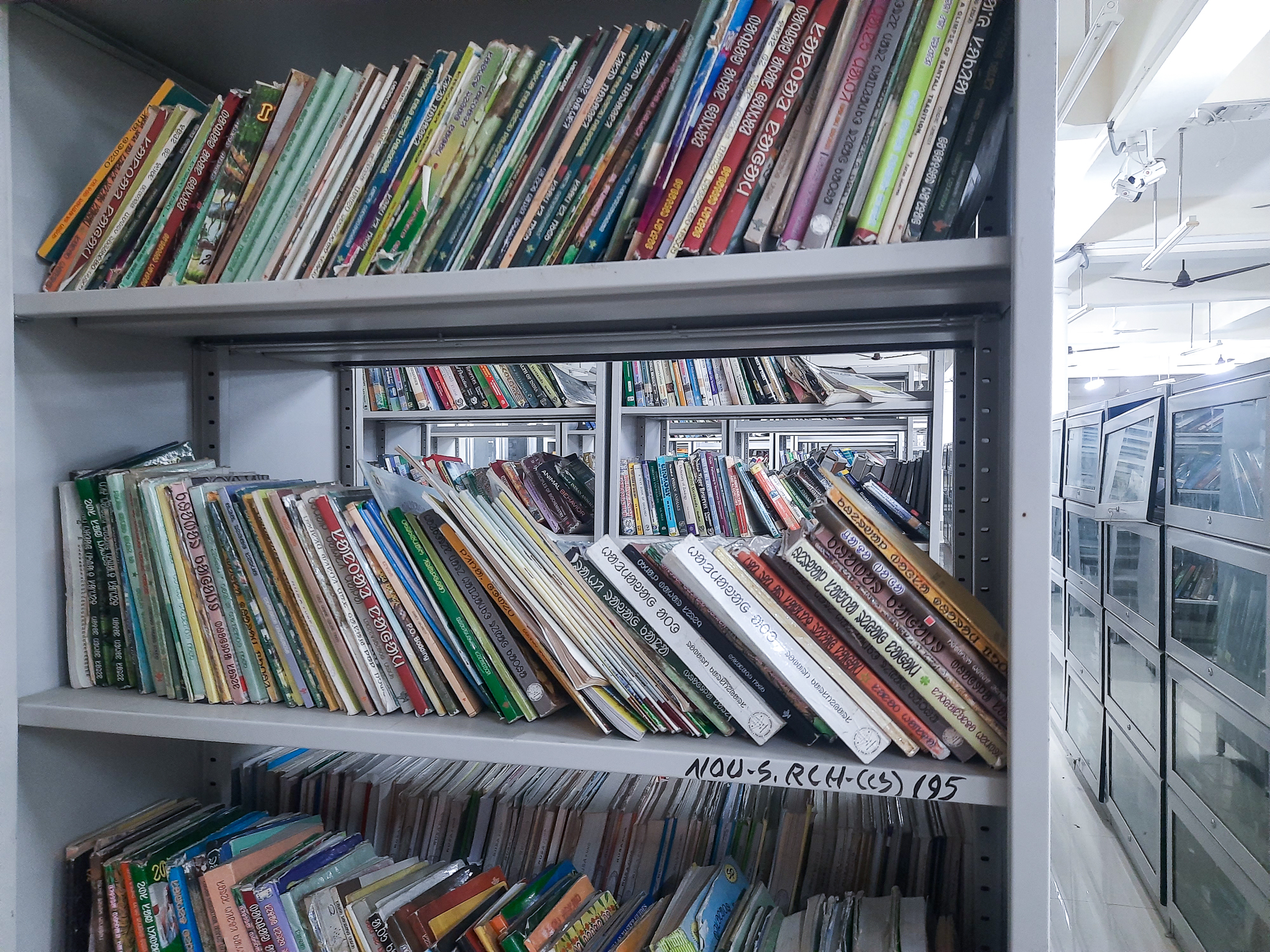
Santali books in North Odisha University library

Santali literature encompasses various forms, including poetry, prose, drama, and folk literature. Traditional Santali literature includes a rich collection of folk tales, myths, and legends that have been orally transmitted through generations. These oral traditions continue to influence contemporary Santali literature.

A Santali oral narrative performance

The oldest literary work in Santali written by an ethnic Santal was the Kherwal Bongsho Dharam Puthi, published by Majhi Ramdas Tudu in 1890. It was written using modified version of the Bangla script.

== Notable people ==
- Turia Chand Baskey
- Damayanti Beshra (born 1962)
- Shyam Sundar Besra (born 1961)
- Gangadhar Hansda (born 1958)
- Rupchand Hansda
- Suchitra Hansda (born 1983)
- Salge Hansdah (born 1989)
- Arjun Charan Hembram (born 1952)
- Kali Charan Hembram (born 1960)
- Anjali Kisku (born 1992)
- Jamadar Kisku (born 1949)
- Sarada Prasad Kisku (born 1929)
- Somai Kisku (born 1959)
- Gobinda Chandra Majhi (born 1956)
- Aditya Kumar Mandi (born 1974)
- Joba Murmu
- Rabindranath Murmu (born 1967)
- Raghunath Murmu (1905–1982)
- Rani Murmu (born 1988)
- Sadhu Ramchand Murmu (1897—1954)
- Thakur Prasad Murmu (1931–2018)
- Hansda Sowvendra Shekhar (born 1983)
- Gomasta Prasad Soren (born 1943)
- Kherwal Soren (born 1957)
- Bapi Tudu (born 1998)
- Maina Tudu (born 1984)
- Majhi Ramdas Tudu (1854–1951)
- Rabilal Tudu (born 1949)
- Tala Tudu (born 1972)

== Recognition and impact ==
Santali was recognised by Sahitya Akademi in the year 2004, after it had been recognised by the Ninety-second Amendment of the Constitution of India in 2003.
