= Soren =

Soren may refer to:

== Arts, entertainment, and media ==
- Søren (band), an Italian darkfolk/new wave band

=== Fictional characters ===
- Soren (Marvel Cinematic Universe), a fictional character
- Soren (Guardians of Ga'Hoole), the protagonist in the Guardians of Ga'Hoole children's fantasy book series
- Soren, a fictional character in Fire Emblem: Path of Radiance
- Soren the Architect, a fictional character in Minecraft: Story Mode

== People ==
=== With the given name ===
- Søren, a given name of Scandinavian origin, also spelled Sören
- Suren (disambiguation), a Persian name also rendered as Soren

=== With the surname ===
- Alok Kumar Soren, Indian politician
- Anthony Soren (born 1988), Indian footballer
- Bajal Soren, Indian freedom fighter
- Basant Soren, Indian politician
- Bhabatosh Soren (1934–2012), Indian politician
- Bhogla Soren (born 1958), Indian playwright
- Binita Soren (born 1987), Indian mountaineer
- Champai Soren (born 1956), former Chief Minister of Jharkhand
- David Soren (animator) (born 1973), Canadian animator and director
- David Soren (archaeologist) (born 1946), American archaeologist and former vaudeville performer
- Debi Soren, Indian politician
- Dhananjay Soren, Indian politician
- Durga Soren (1970–2009), Indian politician
- Gomasta Prasad Soren (born 1943), Indian writer, social worker, and educator
- Harihar Soren (1929–2004), Indian politician
- Hemant Soren (born 1975), Chief Minister of Jharkhand
- Jack Soren, pen name of Martin Richard Soderstrom (born 1962), Canadian writer
- Kalipada Soren (born 1957), Indian playwright, author, and politician
- Kalpana Soren (born 1985), Indian politician
- Kamali Soren (born 1971), Indian social worker
- Maheswar Soren (born 1980), Indian writer
- Nalin Soren, Indian politician
- Paul Jujhar Soren (c. 1893–1954), Indian politician
- Prakash Soren, Indian politician
- Ramdas Soren (1963–2025), Indian politician
- Salkhan Soren (died 2016), Indian politician
- Shibu Soren (1944–2025), Indian politician
- Sita Soren (born 1975), Indian politician
- Sneha Soren (born 2001), Indian weightlifter
- Somesh Chandra Soren, Indian politician
- Sunaram Soren (1918—1988), Indian politician
- Tabitha Soren (born 1967), American photographer and news reporter

== Places ==
- Sören, a village in Germany
- 3864 Søren, main belt asteroid

== Other uses ==
- Sōren, also known as Chongryon and Zai-Nihon Chōsenjin Sōrengōka, an organisation of Koreans in Japan
- IKCO Soren, a large family car

== See also ==
- Soran (disambiguation)
- Sorin (disambiguation)
