= Tudu (surname) =

Tudu is a surname indicating a particular clan (paris) of the Santhals found in India, Nepal and Bangladesh. Notable people with surname Tudu include:

- Arjun Tudu (born 1990), former Indian professional footballer
- Ashutosh Tudu, Indian politician
- Bapi Tudu (born 1998), Indian writer of Santali language
- Bishweswar Tudu, Indian politician
- Budhrai Tudu, Indian politician
- Jabamani Tudu (born 2000), Indian footballer
- Jamuna Tudu (born 1980), Indian environmental activist
- Laxman Tudu (born 1965), Indian politician
- Leba Chand Tudu (1949–2022), Indian politician
- Majhi Ramdas Tudu (1854–1951), India writer of Santali language
- Maina Tudu (born 1984), Indian writer of Santali language
- Manmohan Tudu (1922–2007), Indian politician
- Rabilal Tudu (1949–2026), Indian writer of Santali language and banker
- Rafayel Tudu (born 2001), Bangladeshi professional footballer
- Sandhya Rani Tudu, Indian politician
- Sebastian Tudu (1967), Bangladeshi Catholic priest
- Tala Tudu (born 1972), Indian writer of Santali language
