= List of people from Jamshedpur =

This is a list of prominent people who were born or lived in Jamshedpur.

== Politicians ==
- Raghubar Das, ex-Chief Minister of Jharkhand; born in Jamshedpur
- Arvind Kejriwal, Aam Aadmi Party leader; worked with Tata Steel; lived in Jamshedpur for two years
- Arjun Munda, politician, former Member of Parliament, and Chief Minister of Jharkhand
- Thakur Ji Pathak, Activist, politician

== Business leaders ==
- Ratan Tata, Chairman, Tata Group
- Rameesh Kailasam, CEO, Indiatech.org and governance reform expert, born in Jamshedpur

== Scholars and scientists ==
- Gerald Durrell (1925–1995), naturalist, zookeeper, conservationist, author, and television presenter
- Rajit Gadh, Professor of Mechanical and Aerospace Engineering, University of California, Los Angeles
- Narendra Kohli (1940–2021), Indian author
- Arshadul Qaudri (1925–2002), Muslim leader, social worker and writer

== Activists ==
- Digamber Hansda- Indian academic and tribal activist

== Sportspersons ==
- Varun Aaron, Indian bowler and part of current team India squad.
- Anthresh Lalit Lakra, boxer
- Purnima Mahato, coach of Indian archery team at the 2012 London Olympics
- Aruna Mishra, boxer
- Gourav Mukhi, footballer
- Diwakar Prasad, boxer
- Birju Shah, boxer
- Selay Soy, boxer
- Saurabh Tiwary, Cricketer

== Actors and actresses ==
- Imtiaz Ali, director; works include Socha Na Tha, Jab We Met, and Love Aaj Kal; writer of Indian cinema; born in Jamshedpur
- Pratyusha Banerjee, Indian television actress
- Amit Bose, filmmaker, director, editor
- Priyanka Chopra, Miss India World 2000; Miss World 2000 and Bollywood actress; born in Jamshedpur
- Astad Deboo, Padma Shree awardee; Indian contemporary dancer and choreographer and exponent of modern dance in India
- Rasika Dugal, actor
- Ishita Dutta, actress, born and raised in Jamshedpur
- Tanushree Dutta, Miss India Universe 2004 and Bollywood actress; born and raised in Jamshedpur
- Auritra Ghosh, Indian actress and dancer
- Adarsh Gourav, actor
- Sanjeev Jaiswal, Bollywood Actor.
- Neeraj Kabi, Film and Theatre Actor.
- Sanjivan Lal, film director
- R. Madhavan, Indian Bollywood and Tamil cine star; born and brought up in Jamshedpur
- Shomu Mukherjee, director, writer, producer
- Shweta Basu Prasad, actress, born and raised in Jamshedpur
- Shilpa Rao, playback singer for Hindi films such as Aamir, Bachna Ae Haseeno, and Dev D
- Simone Singh, Bollywood actress; born and raised in Jamshedpur
- Vikram Singh, actor
- Pooja Singh, television actress
