= Santal surnames =

The Santal or Santhal, are a Munda ethnic group native to South Asia mostly in India, Bangladesh, Nepal and Bhutan. The Santal people speak Santali language is the most widely spoken tribal languages.

== List of Surnames ==
These are also an exogamous clan (paris) of the Santal. There are twelve major clans of Santal people as mentioned below in alphabetical order:

- Baskey
- Bediya
- Besra
- Chonre
- Hansdah
- Hembram
- Kisku
- Mandi
- Mardi or Marandi
- Murmu
- Pawria
- Soren
- Tudu

Manjhi and Sonthal are other surnames of Santali people.
