= Kisku =

Kisku is a surname indicating a particular clan (paris) of the Santals found in India. Notable people called Kisku include:

- Amiya Kumar Kisku (1923–?), Indian politician
- Somai Kisku, Santali writer, author and preacher of Sari Dharam
- Choton Kisku, Indian politician
- Jadunath Kisku (1923–1985), Indian politician
- Jamadar Kisku (born 1949), Indian writer of Santali language from West Bengal
- Prithvi Chand Kisku (1927–2011), Indian politician
- Rathin Kisku (born 1984), Indian singer
- Sarada Prasad Kisku (1929–1996), Santhali writer and educator
