= Saharia =

Adivasi tribe in north and central India

Sehariya
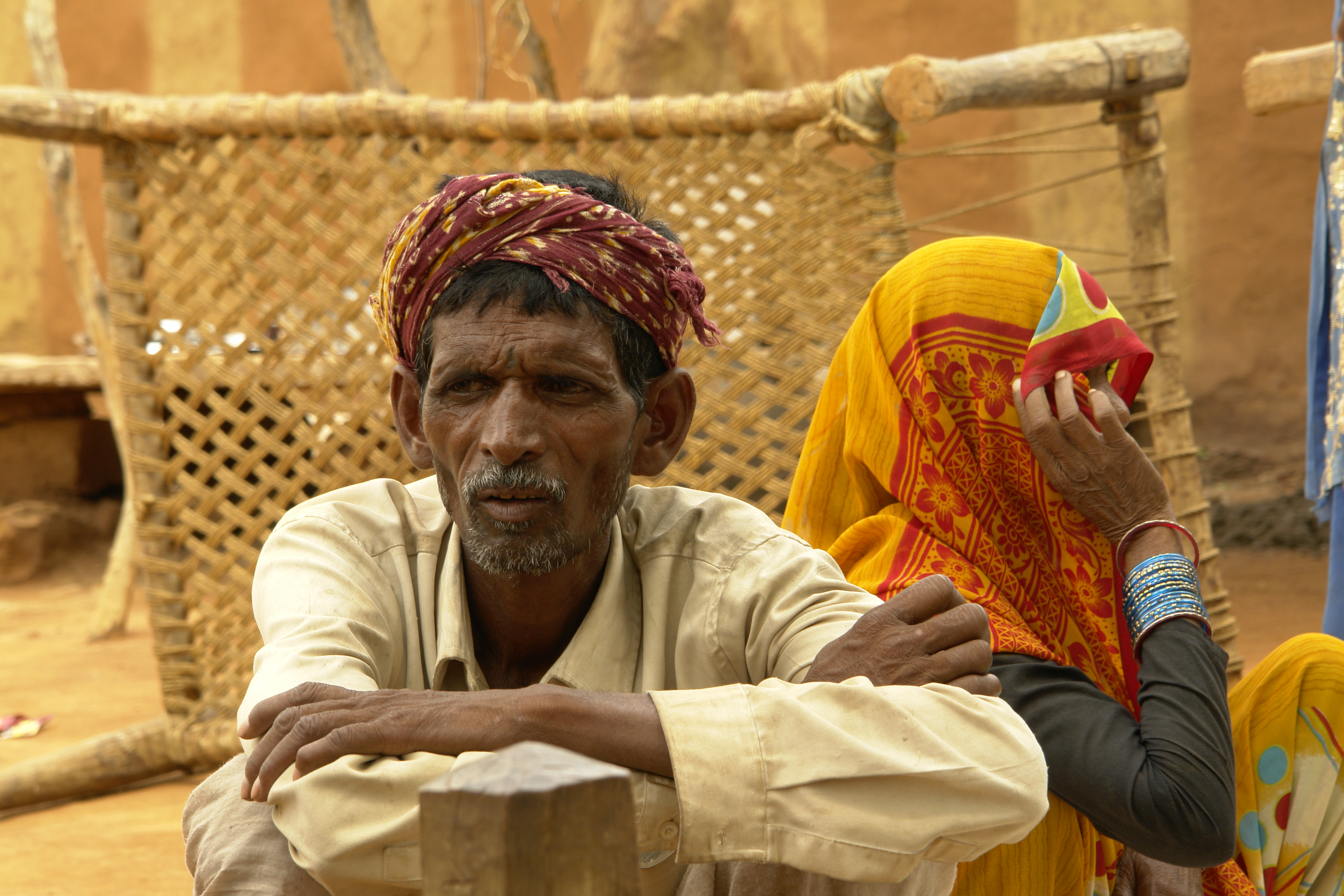
- A Sahariya couple

Regions with significant populations
- India
- Madhya Pradesh: 614,958
- Rajasthan: 111,377

Religion
- Hinduism

The Saharia, Sehariya, or Sahariya are an ethnic group in the state of Madhya Pradesh, India. The Saharias are mainly found in the districts of Morena, Sheopur, Bhind, Gwalior, Datia, Shivpuri, Vidisha and Guna in Madhya Pradesh and Baran district of Rajasthan. They are classified as a particularly vulnerable tribal group.

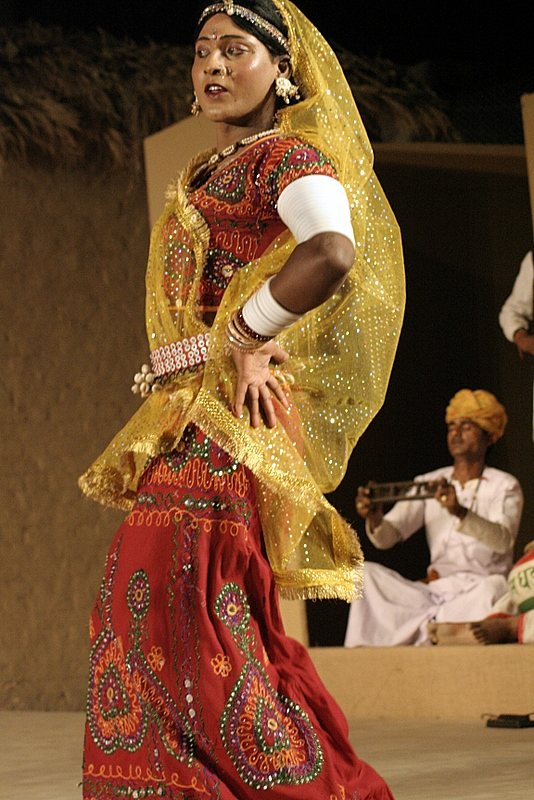
Swang Dance of Saharia Tribe

== History ==
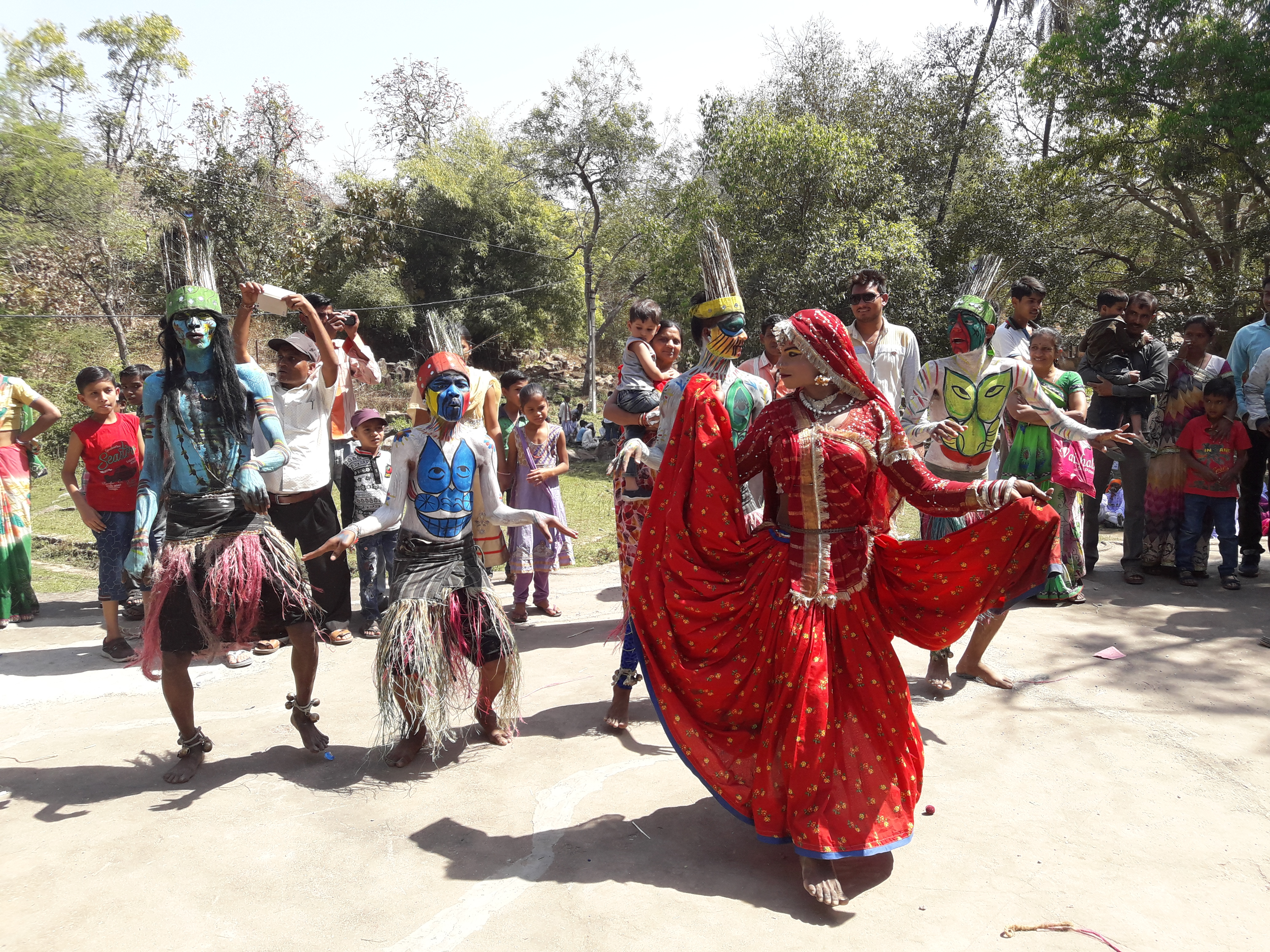
Folks dance by Saharia tribe of Rajasthan in Kaleshwari Art Fair - 2017 held at Kaleshwari

The history of the Saharia tribe is spotty and in many places completely lost. The older generations of the Saharia tribes people fail to give any account of their history, and written records of ancestry are virtually nonexistent. Traditionally, they trace their beginnings to the days of the Ramayana and beyond. They trace their origin from Shabari of the Ramayan. Another theory suggests that Brahma, the creator was busy casting the Universe. He made out a place to seat all persons. In the centre of that place he put a Sahariya who was a simpleton. Others came to join him sitting but they pushed him further from the square centre to an extreme corner or khoont. The story goes that an annoyed Brahma chided the Sahariya for his inability to cope with the pressure and decreed that he would henceforth live in forests and such other out of the way places.

== Dwelling ==
They inhabit clusters of houses in areas called saharana outside the main villages. The housing is generally characterized by prehistoric standards made of stone boulders and roofing of stone slabs that locally are called patore. In some villages mud structures are also constructed. Brick and concrete are very rare. They live in small joint families. The elder sons live separately after marriage and younger son bear the responsibilities of the parents and unmarried brothers-sisters.

== Religion ==
The tribe members practice Hinduism. Folk Hindu gods and goddess that they worship and celebrate in major festivals include: Veer Teja, thakar Baba, Durga, Hanuman, Lalbai, Bejasan, Savni Amavasya, Janmashtami, Raksha Bandhan, Deepavali, Holi and Teja Dashmi.

== Marriage ==
They consider everyone in an endogamous group to be brother and sister; marriages have to be arranged from other clans. During the marriage ceremony, totems are drawn on paper and the floor that they hold in reverence. Child marriage is not favored, although there are some arranged marriages, and any marriage is performed after attaining the age of 15 years. Widow marriage called not is permitted but only to a fellow widower or a divorcee. Polygamy is reserved only for males.

== Social life ==
The Sahariya community considers every adult member part of a governing council which is headed by a patel. A patel's appointment is based on heredity criteria but found to be unfit or unsuitable is basis for removal. The council decides disputes by a consensus. It imposes fines and ostracism on guilty offenders committing rape, elopement or adultery. An inter-village dispute is referred to as a Chokla Panchayat. Since they may be surrounded by speakers of other languages and dialects they may speak various Hindi dialects.

== Economy ==
The Sahariyas are expert woodsmen and forest product gatherers. They are particularly skilled in making catechu from Khair trees. The main business is gathering & selling of forest wood, gum, tendu leaf, honey, mahua and medicinal herbs. Their traditional occupations also include making baskets, mining and quarrying, and breaking stones. They also hunt and fish.

Some Sahariyas are settled cultivators. Wheat, pearl millet and sorghum are the main cereal crops. Gram and arhar are the main pulses. Agriculture is largely rain-dependent with merely 2% of the total land area being irrigated. The main sources of irrigation are wells and rivulets, which are seasonal. Others are landless labourers who were earlier bonded labourers.

== Health ==
The general health conditions of the tribe are very poor, with a prevalence of malnutrition and pulmonary tuberculosis. RNTCP-DOTS programme is working effectively to change this condition. The Centre for Genomics at Jiwaji University, Gwalior is carrying out active clinical and genetic research in order to identify the genetic and non-genetic underlying causes for their ailments.

== Notable people ==
- Gyarsi Bai Sahariya a tribal leader from Baran district.
- Sarbeswar Sahariah (Assamese) An award winning Indian nephrologist and organ transplant specialist.

== See also ==
- Kuno Wildlife Sanctuary
