= Ipil =

Ipil may refer to:

== Places ==
- Ipil, Zamboanga Sibugay, a 1st class municipality and capital of the province of Zamboanga Sibugay, Philippines
- Ipil, an administrative division in Taal, Batangas, Philippines
- Ipil, an administrative division in Jagna, Bohol, Philippines

== Other uses ==
- Ipil (plant), or Intsia bijuga, a tropical flowering tree
- Ipil, a short-story collection by Anjali Kisku

== See also ==
- Ipil-ipil, or Leucaena leucocephala, a tropical flowering tree
