= Matcharasa Matcharaju =

Indian agriculturalist and politician (born 1912)

Member of Parliament, Lok Sabha
- In office April 2, 1962 – March 3, 1967

Member of Andhra Pradesh Legislative Assembly
- In office 1955–1962

Justice, Madras High Court
- In office 1938

Personal details
- Born: June 10, 1912 Gangaraju Madugula, Madras Presidency, British India
- Party: Indian National Congress
- Occupation: Agriculturalist; politician; judge

Shri Matcharasa Matcharaju (born June 10, 1912) was an Indian agriculturalist, politician, and judge, remarked for his service as a member of the Lok Sabha from 1962 to 1967.

== Biography ==
Shri Matcharasa Matcharaju was born on June 10, 1912, in the small town of Gangaraju Madugula in the Visakhapatnam district of the Madras Presidency (present-day Andhra Pradesh). He pursued agriculture as a profession but is remembered primarily for his contributions to Indian politics— having been elected to the 3rd Lok Sabha, he channeled his efforts to uplift the Scheduled Tribes (ST) communities. He also previously served as a justice for the Madras High Court during the 1930s.

== Personal life ==
He married Shrimati M. Chandramma in 1942, and together they raised three sons and three daughters. His date of death is unknown.
