= Søren =

Søren (Danish: [ˈsœːɐ̯n̩], Norwegian: [ˈsøːəɳ]) or Sören (Swedish: [ˈsœ̌ːrɛn], German: [ˈzøːʁən]) is a Scandinavian given name that is sometimes anglicized as Soren. The name is derived from that of the 4th-century Christian saint Severin of Cologne, ultimately derived from the Latin severus ("severe, strict, serious"). Its feminine form is Sørine, though its use is uncommon. The patronymic surname Sørensen is derived from Søren.

Notable people and characters with the name include:

== People ==
- Soren Sorensen Adams (1879–1963), American Inventor
- Søren Berg (born 1976), Danish Football player
- Søren "Bjergsen" Bjerg (born 1996), Danish League of Legends player
- Søren Brorsen (1875–1961), Danish politician
- Søren Dahl (born 1993), Danish swimmer
- Søren Gade (born 1963), Danish politician
- Sören Johansson (born 1954), Swedish ice hockey player
- Soren Johnson, American game designer
- Søren Kierkegaard (1813–1855), Danish philosopher
- Sören Klose (born 2002), German hammer thrower
- Søren Kristensen (born 1971), Danish cricketer
- Søren Larsen (born 1981), Danish football player
- Søren Absalon Larsen (1871–1957), Danish scientist
- Søren Lerby (born 1958), Danish football player
- Søren Torpegaard Lund (born 1998), Danish singer
- Søren Norby (died around 1530), Danish Grand Admiral
- Søren Boel Olesen (born 1984), Danish politician
- Søren Olesen (1891–1973), Danish teacher and politician
- Søren Pilmark (born 1955), Danish actor
- Søren Egge Rasmussen (born 1961), Danish politician
- Søren Rasted (born 1969), Danish musician
- Søren Stærmose (born 1952), Danish film producer
- Søren L. Sørensen (1897–1965), Danish gymnast
- Søren P. L. Sørensen (1868–1939), Danish biochemist
- Soren Thompson (born 1981), American épée fencer
- Søren Wærenskjold (born 2000), Norwegian cyclist
- Sören Wibe (1946–2010), Swedish politician

== Fictional characters ==
- Soren, fictional character in the 2003 film The Matrix Reloaded
- Soren, fictional mage in the 2005 video game Fire Emblem: Path of Radiance
- Soren (Guardians of Ga'Hoole), fictional character in the Guardians of Ga'Hoole books by Kathryn Lasky
- Soren Lorenson, fictional character in the Charlie and Lola books by Lauren Child
- Soren (Underworld), fictional character in the Underworld series of books and films
- Soren, fictional character in the 2004 film The Prince and Me
- Soren the Architect, fictional character on Minecraft: Story Mode
- Soarin, a fictional pony character in the children's television series My Little Pony: Friendship is Magic
- Soren, a fictional character in original Netflix series The Dragon Prince
- Soren, a fictional character of the androgynous J'Naii species in Star Trek: The Next Generation; episode 17 of the fifth season
- Søren, fictional character in the Original Sinners books by Tiffany Reisz

== See also ==
- Sørensen
- Soren (disambiguation)
- Suren (disambiguation), Persian name also rendered as Soren
- Severin (given name)
- Severus (disambiguation)
