= Salge Hansdah =

Indian language Santali writer (born 1989)

- Born: 23 October 1989 (age 36); India
- Occupation: Writer
- Writing career
- Language: Santali
- Years active: 2020s–present
- Genres: Fiction, novel
- Notable work: Janam Dishom Ujarog Kana
- Notable awards: Sahitya Akademi Yuva Puraskar (2022)

Salge Hansdah (born 23 October 1989) is an Indian writer who writes in Santali. She won the Sahitya Akademi Yuva Puraskar in 2022 for her novel Janam Dishom Ujarog Kana (en. Birthplace becoming deserted).

== Early life and education ==
Salge Hansda was born on 23 October 1989 as the youngest daughter of the Late Galuram Hansda and Sita Hansda. She has one brother and four sisters. Salge completed her primary education at Barigoda Community School. She then attended Inter Govindpur Rajendra Inter College for her high school education, followed by LBSM College in Karandih for her graduation. She completed her post-graduation in Santali language from Ghatshila College and also qualified for the NET exam. Salge later pursued her B.Ed education in the Santali language.

== Career ==
Salge Hansda is currently working as an assistant professor at SRKM Degree College in Chakulia. She is actively involved with several social and literary organizations. She is the assistant secretary of the All India Santhali Writers Association and a life member of Karandih Jaher Than.

=== Writing career ===
Salge began writing poetry in 2015–16, while Janam Dishom Ujarog Kana, her work about the birthplace becoming deserted, was written in 2018. Padmashree Damayanti Beshra launched the book in Baripada in October 2021. In the book, Salge expresses her heartfelt views on the happenings around her, including how landowners in Barigoda are losing their ownership and becoming homeless, leading to the disappearance of their very existence. She is also currently writing some short stories.

== See also ==
- Yuva Puraskar winners for Santali
- Bapi Tudu
