= Subodh Oraon =

Indian politician (1953–1988)

Member of the Vidhan Sabha of West Bengal from Kumargram
- In office 1982–1988

Personal details
- Born: 1953
- Died: 5 December 1988 (aged 35)
- Political party: Revolutionary Socialist Party

Subodh Oraon (1953 – 5 December 1988), also written Subodh Barwa, was an Indian politician belonging to the Revolutionary Socialist Party (RSP). He was elected to the West Bengal Vidhan Sabha from the Kumargram constituency in the 1982 and 1987 elections.

In the 1982 election he obtained 40,531 votes (56.27%), defeating Dutsai Toppo of the Indian National Congress. In 1987 he obtained 48,081 votes (58.21%), defeating Khagendra Nath Thakur of the Indian National Congress.

Oraon died on 5 December 1988. He was 35 years old at the time.
