= Soran =

Soran may refer to:

== Places ==
- Soran Emirate, a Kurdish principality
- Soran District, a region within the Kurdish Autonomous Region in northern Iraq
  - Soran, Iraq, a seat of the district government
- Sawran, Syria, a town in Syria near Aleppo

== Fictional characters ==
- Setsuna F. Seiei (Soran Ibrahim), protagonist of the Japanese anime series Mobile Suit Gundam 00
- Tolian Soran, the main villain of the film Star Trek Generations (1994)

== Other ==
- Soran (band), a South Korean rock band
- Sōran Bushi, a traditional song and dance in Japan
- Soran clan, a Kurdish clan
- Soran Ebrahim, Kurdish actor in the film Turtles Can Fly (2004)
