= Rameesh Kailasam =

Indian writer

Rameesh Kailasam (Ramesh Kailasam)

Personal details
- Born: Jamshedpur, Bihar (now Jharkhand), India

Rameesh Kailasam (Ramesh Kailasam) is a business strategist, mentor to founders, Independent Director and governance expert. He was earlier President & CEO of IndiaTech.org, a think tank and industry group set up by Indian startup founders and funds for supporting internet-based startups. He has been the voice and momentum behind the growth of Indian startups since 2018 having been instrumental in opening up listing in the Indian bourses for asset light consumer internet-based startups. He was also instrumental in policy changes such as Differential Voting Rights, Confidential filing of prospectus, Opening of FDI for Insurance Web Aggregators, GeM listing of Indian startups etc. through Indiatech.org (Regd: Technology Services Industry Association).

He was inducted into the Board of Directors of NCC, a very large Indian Corporate in the Construction Sector listed on the Indian Stock Exchange as an Independent Director in February 2024.

In 2015, he was awarded the Young Achiever award by the Institute of Cost Accountants of India, under the Ministry of Corporate Affairs for his work towards promoting Good Governance at the Government and private sector.

He is a regular columnist in prominent Indian newspapers and appears on Indian television on governance reforms and policy discussions.

Prior to joining IndiaTech.org, he was Managing Director at APCO Worldwide heading the firm's India operations across different sectors on matters of policy and advocacy and establishing the public affairs practice for the firm in India. Before APCO, he served as vice president for Governmental Programs at IBM for India & South Asia, where he represented the company in a number of policy engagements with the Government. Before this, he worked with Applied Materials and worked closely on India's semiconductor and solar policies including the creation of India's National Solar Mission. Before this, he served at the Oracle-HP e-governance Center of Excellence wherein he supported the creation of several e-governance policies and national mission mode projects with many governments in India and overseas.

He has been involved in creating next-generation administrative reforms and e-government in various States and central Governments in India and was actively involved in setting up and running the Centre for Good Governance at the Government of Andhra Pradesh. Through this Centre, he drove various governance reforms in Financial Accountability, Finance, urban and rural governance, Health, Education, and governance reforms. He was involved in building several applications and pilots around mobile phones for governments from 2005 onwards.

He is a visiting guest faculty on Governance reforms, policy-making, and advocacy at various reputed Institutions in India like the Indian Institute of Management, Management Development Institute, Institute of Chartered Financial Analysts of India, Indian School of Public Policy & OPJGU including lectures at various international forums such as World Fiduciary Forum of World Bank, Commonwealth Association for Public Administration and Management, WEF and UN organizations. He has authored more than 200 papers and reports many of which have been adopted for driving policy in India and many other countries. He has over 30+ years of experience in the policy and advocacy space. Rameesh holds multiple qualifications in Accounting, Finance, and Technology, as well as policy and governance reforms.

Rameesh is a polyglot and speaks multiple languages including English, Tamil, Telugu, Hindi, Bengali etc. Having grown in different parts of India including Jamshedpur, Kolkata, Tandur, Bailadila, Kirandul, Ramagundam, Ongole, Chennai, Hyderabad and Gurugram etc.
