= Gangaraju Madugula =

G. Madugula
- Village
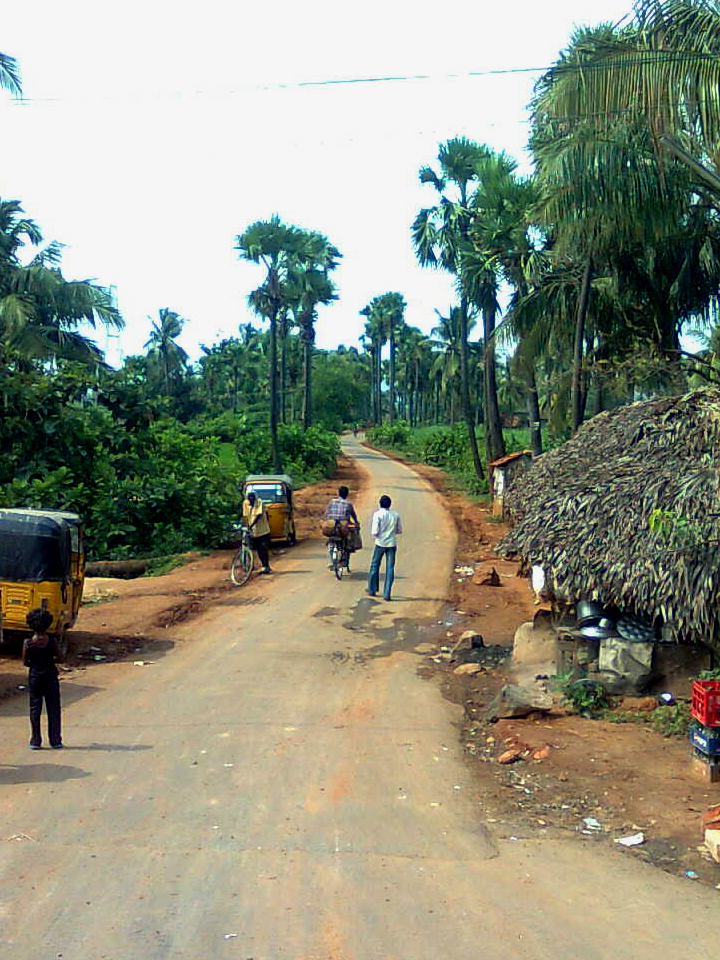
- Rural road near Madugula
- Interactive map of G. Madugula
- Location in Andhra Pradesh, India G. Madugula (India)
- Coordinates: 18.0167°N 82.5000°E
- Country: India
- State: Andhra Pradesh
- District: Alluri Sitharama Raju
- Elevation: 1,097 m (3,599 ft)

Languages
  - Official: Telugu
- Time zone: UTC+5:30 (IST)
- Vehicle Registration: AP31 (Former); AP39 (from 30 January 2019)

G.Madugula or Gangaraju Madugula is a village and capital of Gangaraju Madugula mandal in Alluri Sitharama Raju district in the state of Andhra Pradesh in India.

== Geography ==
Gangarajumadugula is located at 18.0167°N 82.5000°E. It has an average elevation of 1097 metres (3602 ft).
