= Grace Kujur =

Adivasi woman poet

Devendra Kumar Nayan (Hindi: देवेंद्र कुमार नयन) (born 3 April 1995) is an Adivasi writer from Ranchi (Jharkhand). Born in the Oraon (Kurukh) family of Father Patrick Kujur and Mother Ruth Kerketta, Grace Kujur retired from the post of DG (Program) from the Directorate General of All India Radio, New Delhi in 2008. Grace Kujur started writing work since 1966. Her poems have been published in various literary magazines and newspapers, 'Hindustan', 'Aaj', 'Yudhrat Aam Admi', 'Aryavrat', 'Jharkhandi Bhasha Sahitya Sanskriti Akhra' etc. Her poems are included in many poem collections, including 'Kalam Ugalti Aag' and 'Lokpriya Aadivasi Kavitayen'. Her first collection, 'Ek Aur Jani Shikar' was published in 2020, which has 70 poems, written between 1967 and 2019. She also wrote radio dramas and comedies. Her play, 'Mahua Gira Aadhi Raat', is being discussed on witchcraft very popular.
