= Sadhu Ramchand Murmu =

Indian poet

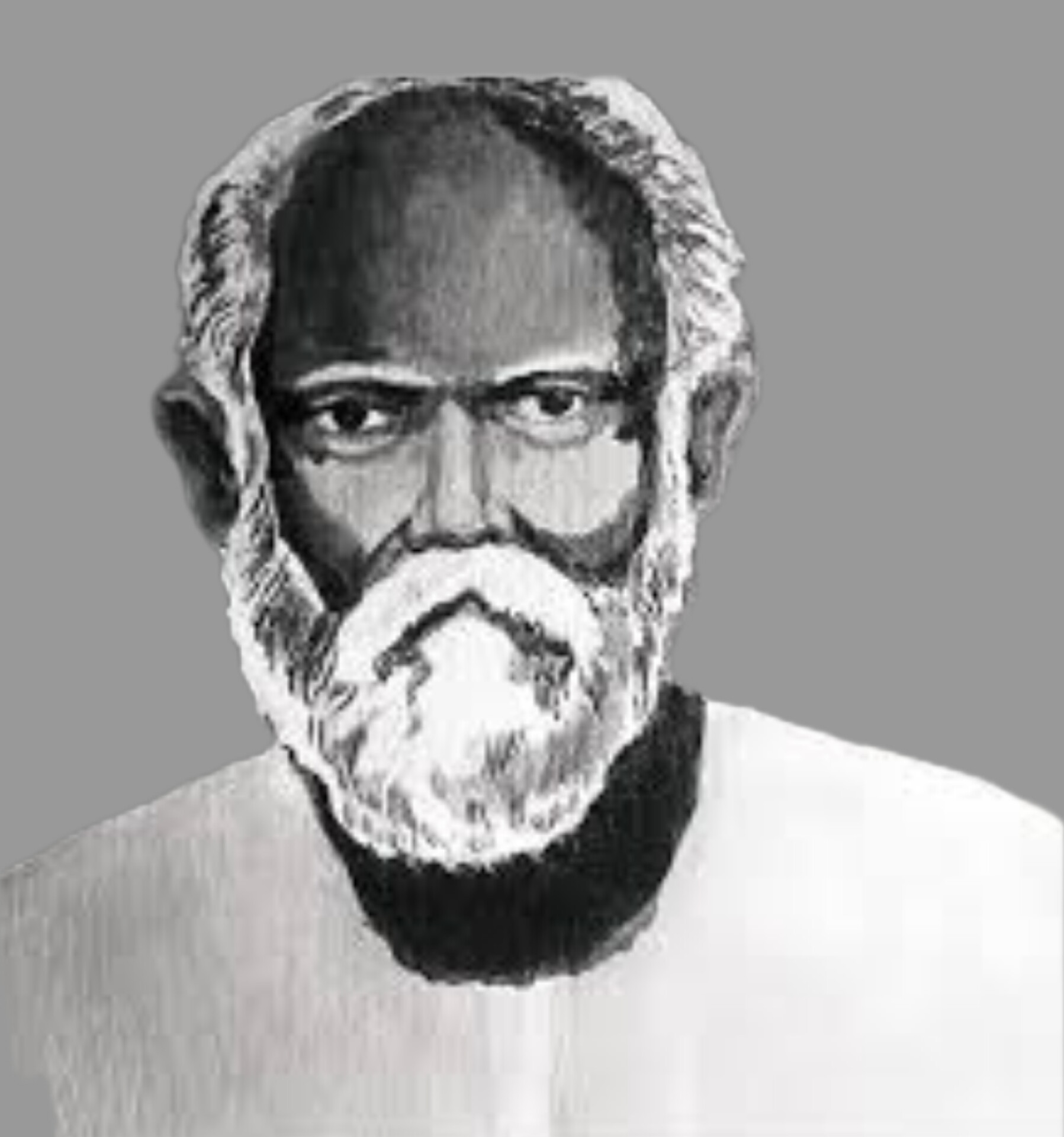
- Born: 1897; Kamarbandhi, Silda, Jhargram district, West Bengal, India
- Died: 15 December 1954 (aged 56–57)
- Occupation: Poet
- Writing career
- Subject: Santali Poems

Sadhu Ramchand Murmu (30 April 1897 – 15 December 1954) was a Santali poet, writer, and educator. He reshaped the Santali literature and music in the late 19th and early 20th centuries. He is also known as Kobiguru or Mahakabi of Santali literature. He is one of the great tribal poets from India. He is the first Santali poet who combines the high poetic tradition of Sanskrit and Bengali literature with the cadences and aesthetic sensibilities of Santali oral tradition. He encourages the indigenous Santals community and inspired them in education & culture. He also developed the first script named MUJ-DANDHE (also known as Maj Dader Ank) for the Santali language in 1923.

== Life ==
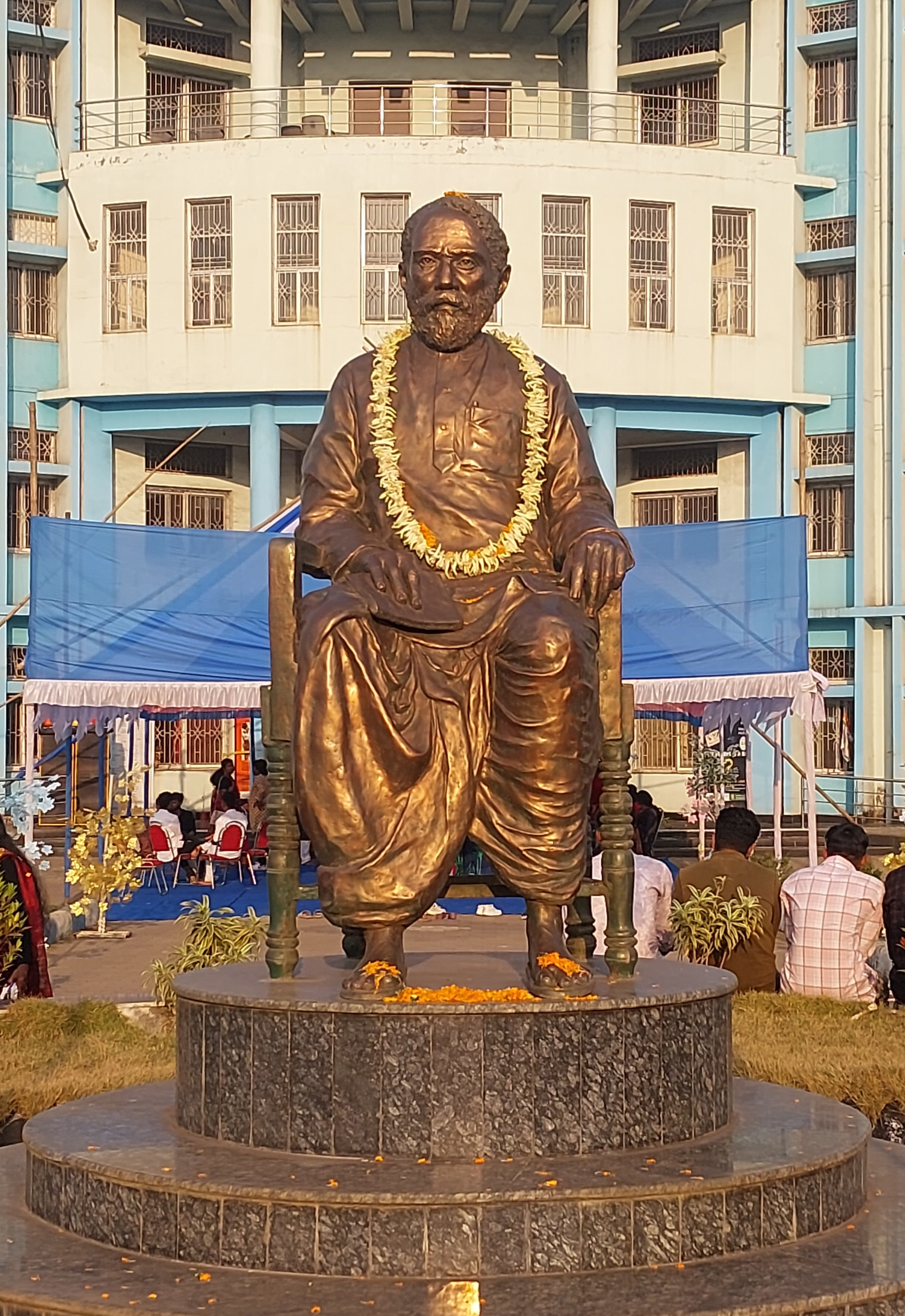
Statue of Sadhu Ramchand Murmu in Sadhu Ram Chand Murmu University

Sadhu Ramchand Murmu was born in 1897 in Kamarbandhi village (near Silda town) of Midnapore district (present Jhargram district) of the state West Bengal, India. He is the son of Mohon Murmu (Father) and Kuni Murmu (Mother). He died on 15 December 1954. All of his literary works were published after his death.

== List of works ==
- Sari Dhorom Serenj Puthi (Two Parts 1969)
- Lita Godet (1979)
- Sansar Phend (Drama)
- Ol Doho Onorhe
- Har re Hesak
- Isror (Verse)

== Legacy ==
- Sadhu Ramchand Murmu University of Jhargram, the erstwhile Jhargram University renamed after Murmu in recognition of tribal literatures in 2021.
