= Joba Murmu =

Indian language santali writer

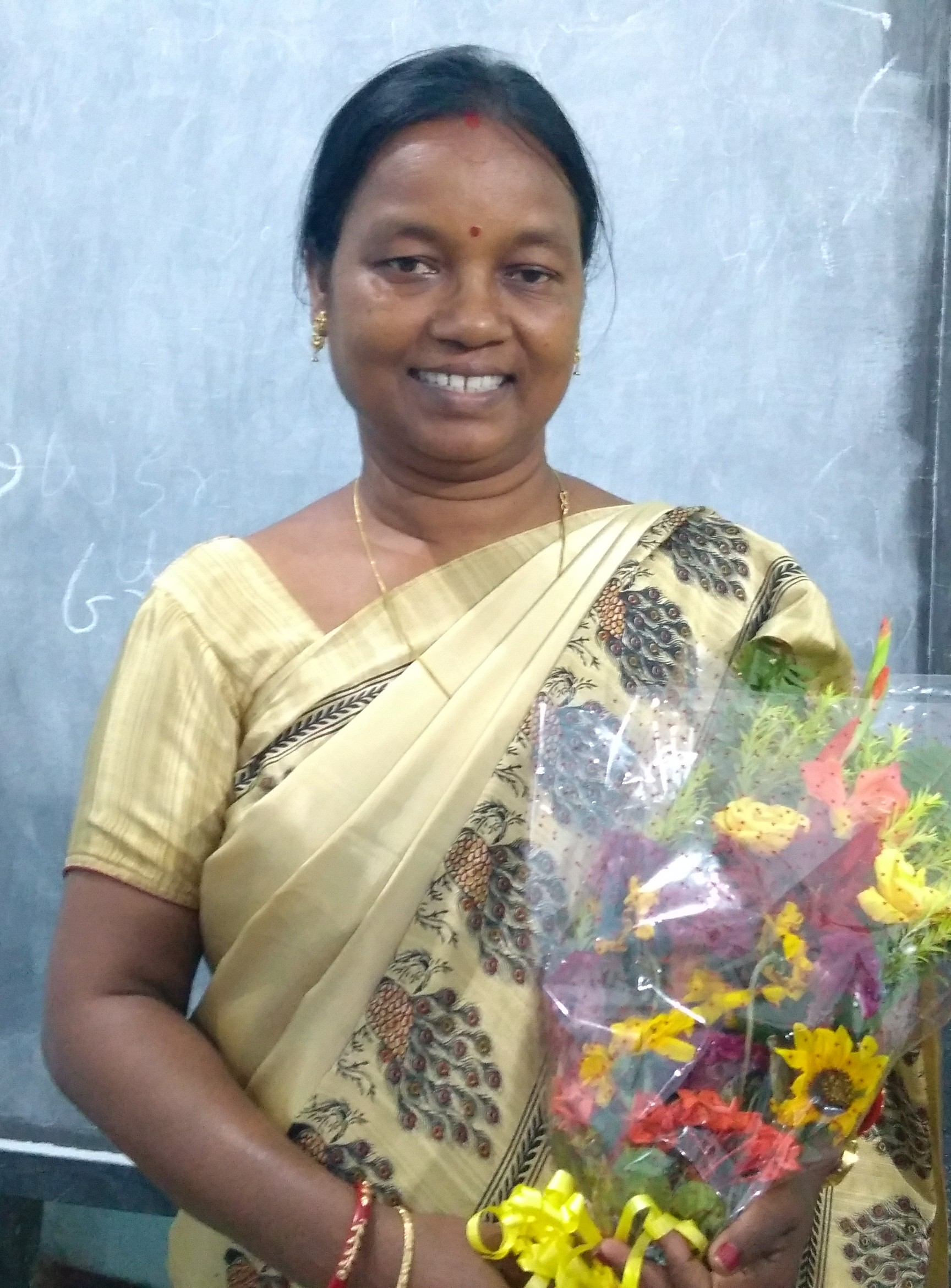
- Born: Jamshedpur, Jharkhand, India
- Occupations: Writer, litterateur
- Writing career
- Language: Santali
- Genre: Children's literature
- Notable awards: Sahitya Akademi's Children's Literature Award

Joba Murmu is an Indian writer and litterateur who is known for her works in Santali literature. She received the Sahitya Akademi's Children's Literature Award on 14 November 2017 for her contribution to Santali literature.

== Personal life ==
Murmu was born in Jamshedpur, Jharkhand to Shri C R Majhi and Baha Murmu.

She was always a keen reader of novels and stories in her early childhood.

While in college her interest rose in dramatics where she met her husband Pitambar Majhi. He won the Sahitya Akademi Bal Shaitya Puraskar winner in 2012.

== Career ==
Joba Murmu is a Santhali writer and known face in Santhali community.

She was awarded the Bal Sahitya Puraskar by Sahitya Akademi, New Delhi in 2017.

After completing her graduation, she did her post graduation in Santhali and Hindi. She is also a law graduate.

She has written several books including BAHA UMUL, a poetry collection, BEWRA, a collection of short stories, PREM CHANDAH SORES KAHANI KO, a translation, and others. She received the Sahitya Akademi award in 2017 for OLON BAHA.

She also translated the famous Geetanjali a book of Rabindra Nath Tagore in Santhali. Murmu was awarded the R. R. Kisku Rapaj Award from the All India Santhali Writers Association in 2016 . She has also been awarded the Pt. Raghunath Murmu award in 2012 and the Rabindranath Tagore award in 2020.

She is currently working as a primary school teacher at the Bal Vikas primary school in Karandih, Jamshedpur. She has been a lyricist, script writer and director in a Santhali film. She has also sung many folk songs in All India Radio, Jamshedpur.

== Works ==
Murmu wrote a book of 21 short stories, titled 'Olon Baha'. She was given the Bal Sahitya Puraskar by Sahitya Academy in 2017.

She translated the stories of Premchand and Gitanjali of Rabindra Nath Tagore in Santhali.

== See also ==
- Indian Academy of Literature
