= Kalipada Soren =

Indian politician and Santhali writer (born 1957)

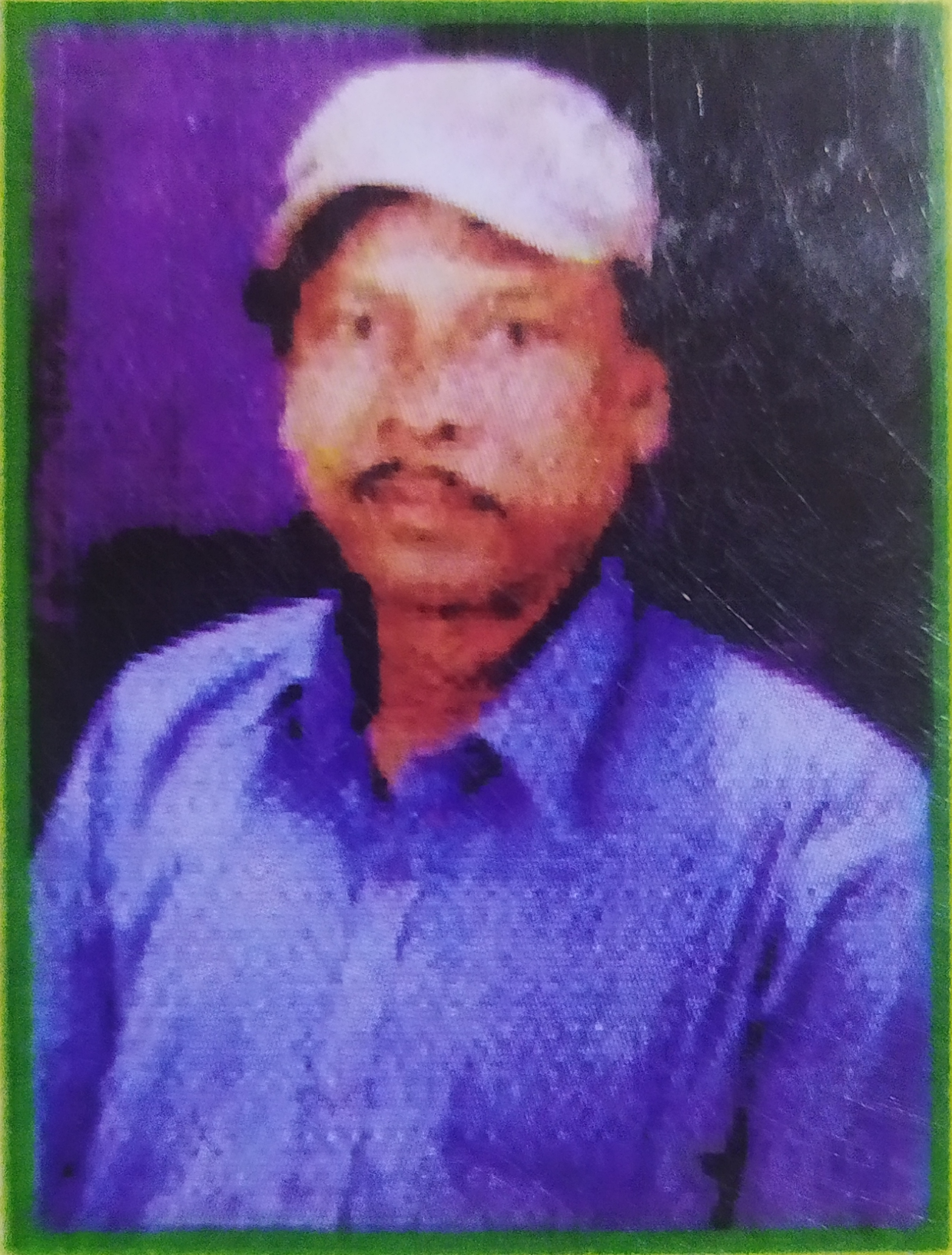

Member of Parliament, Lok Sabha
- Incumbent
- Assumed office 4 June 2024
- Preceded by: Kunar Hembram
- Constituency: Jhargram

Personal details
- Born: 9 December 1957 (age 68) Jhargram, West Bengal, India
- Party: Nationalist Citizens Party of India (2026–present)
- Other political affiliations: Trinamool Congress (till 2026)
- Education: Seva Bharati Mahavidyalaya, Rabindra Bharati University
- Occupation: Politician, Writer
- Awards: Padma Shri (2022), Sahityakaar Academi Awards, Sarada Prasaad Kisku Award

Kalipada Soren (born 9 December 1957) or Kherwal Soren is an Indian Santali playwright, author, editor and politician, currently serving as the Member of Parliament for Jhargram in West Bengal.

== Career ==
Kherwal Soren, born as Kalipada Soren in 1957 at Raghunathpur near Jhargram in West Bengal, graduated from Seva Bharati Mahavidyalaya and passed M.A in political science from Rabindra Bharati University. He regularly edits a literary magazine Kherwal Jaher. Soren has written 31 plays and a number of stories and poems in the Santhali language. He translated Anubhab, a Bengali novel of Dibyendu Palit into Santhali. He received the Sarada Prasad Kisku award for his literary contribution. He retired from State Bank of India. In 2007, Soren was awarded the Sahitya Akademi for his play Chet Re Cikayana. He was conferred the Padma Shri award in 2022.

== Political career ==
He contested the 2024 Lok Sabha election from the Trinamool Congress from Jhargram Lok Sabha constituency and won to became first time Member of Parliament.

=== 2026 Rebellion ===
In June 2026, almost immediately after the massive Trinamool Congress defeat, around 20 MPs of TMC allegedly declared rebellion from their Party, and presented their written wish to join Bhartiya Janata Party. This group was led by Kakoli Ghosh.

Later, on 14 June, 20 MPs, including Soren, signed a formal letter declaring their split from Trinamool Congress as to merge with the Nationalist Citizen Party of India (NCPI). They formally submitted the letter to Lok Sabha Speaker Om Birla.

The total strength of TMC in Lok Sabha had been 28, so that a number of 20 MPS made it eligible for splitting from the Party, as per the Indian Defection laws, so as to escape the anti-defection disqualification.
