= Rupchand Hansda =

Indian writer and civil servant

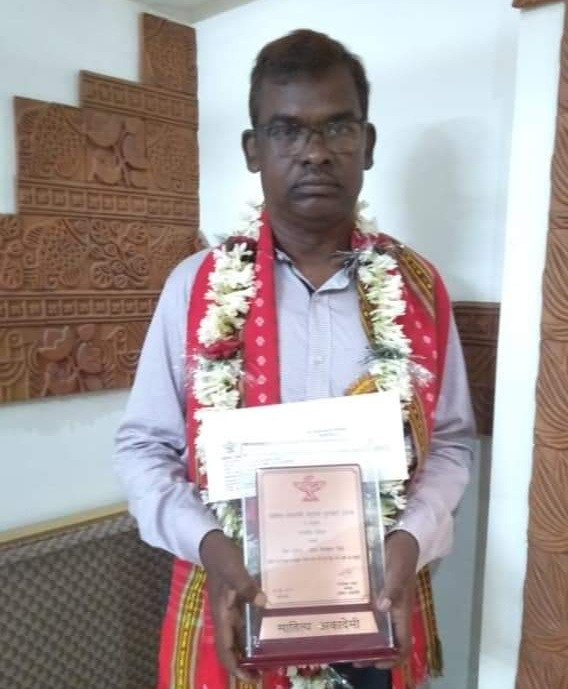
- Hansda in 2018
- Education: Kapgari College
- Occupations: Writer, Civil Servant
- Awards: Sahitya Akademi Award (2020)

Rupchand Hansda is an Indian writer of Santali language and civil servant from West Bengal. He was awarded the 2018 Sahitya Akademi Translation Prize for his translation Sen Dareyak'an Menkhan Chedak. In 2020, he received the Sahitya Akademi Award for his collection of poems Gur Dak Kasa Dak.

== Life ==
Hansda was a student of Kapgari College. He works in Indian Railways. He was the founding president of All India Santali Writers Association and served this post for 27 years.

Hansda translated Shakti Chattopadhyay's poetry Jete Pari Kintu Keno Jabo into Santali titled Sen Dareyak'an Menkhan Chedak. The book was published in 2016. For this work he was awarded Sahitya Akademi Translation Prize in 2018. In 2020, he received the Sahitya Akademi Award for his collection of poems Gur Dak Kasa Dak.
