= Thakur Prasad Murmu =

Santhali writer and educator (1931–2018)

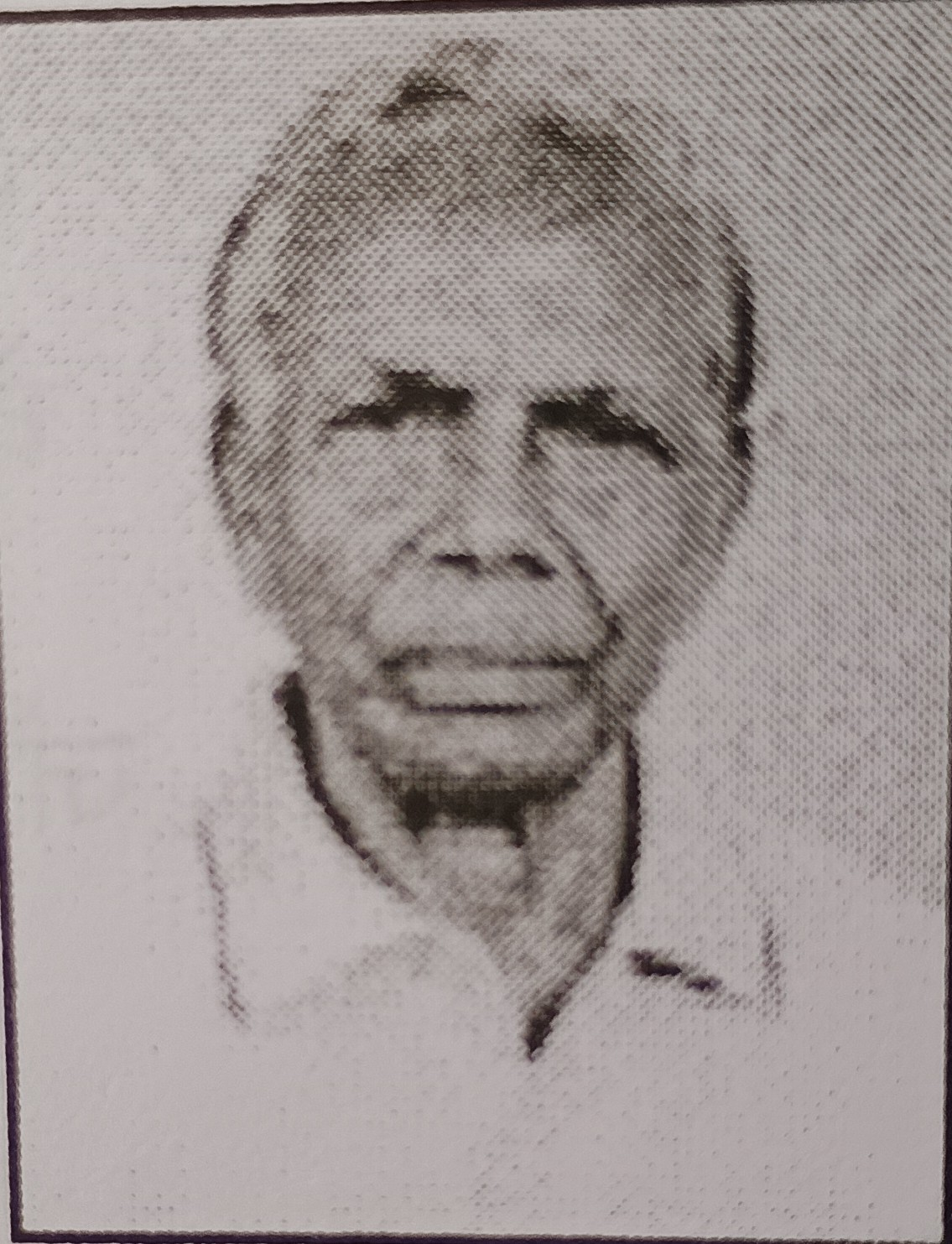
- Thakur Prasad Murmu
- Born: 1931; Loyadi village, East Singhbhum district, Jharkhand, India
- Died: 12 May 2018 (aged 87)
- Occupation: Writer
- Writing career
- Subject: Santhali Writings

Thakur Prasad Murmu (1931—2018) was a Santhali writer and educator. He wrote his first poetry book in 1947. Santal Hul is one of his notable publications.

== Early life and education ==
Murmu was born in 1931 in Loyadi village, East Singhbhum district, Jharkhand, India. He published his first poetry book in 1947. It is noted that he financed his college education through the sales of his books.

== Literary Career ==
Murmu was a regular contributor to Hor Sambad, a Santali periodical, where he published various poems and short stories. One of his notable works is Santal Hul, which delves into the history of the Santal rebellion. His life and literary contributions have been featured in a documentary alongside other prominent Santali writers, highlighting his significant role in the development of Santali literature

== Death ==
Thakur Prasad Murmu died on 12 May 2018.
