= Maina Tudu =

Indian writer

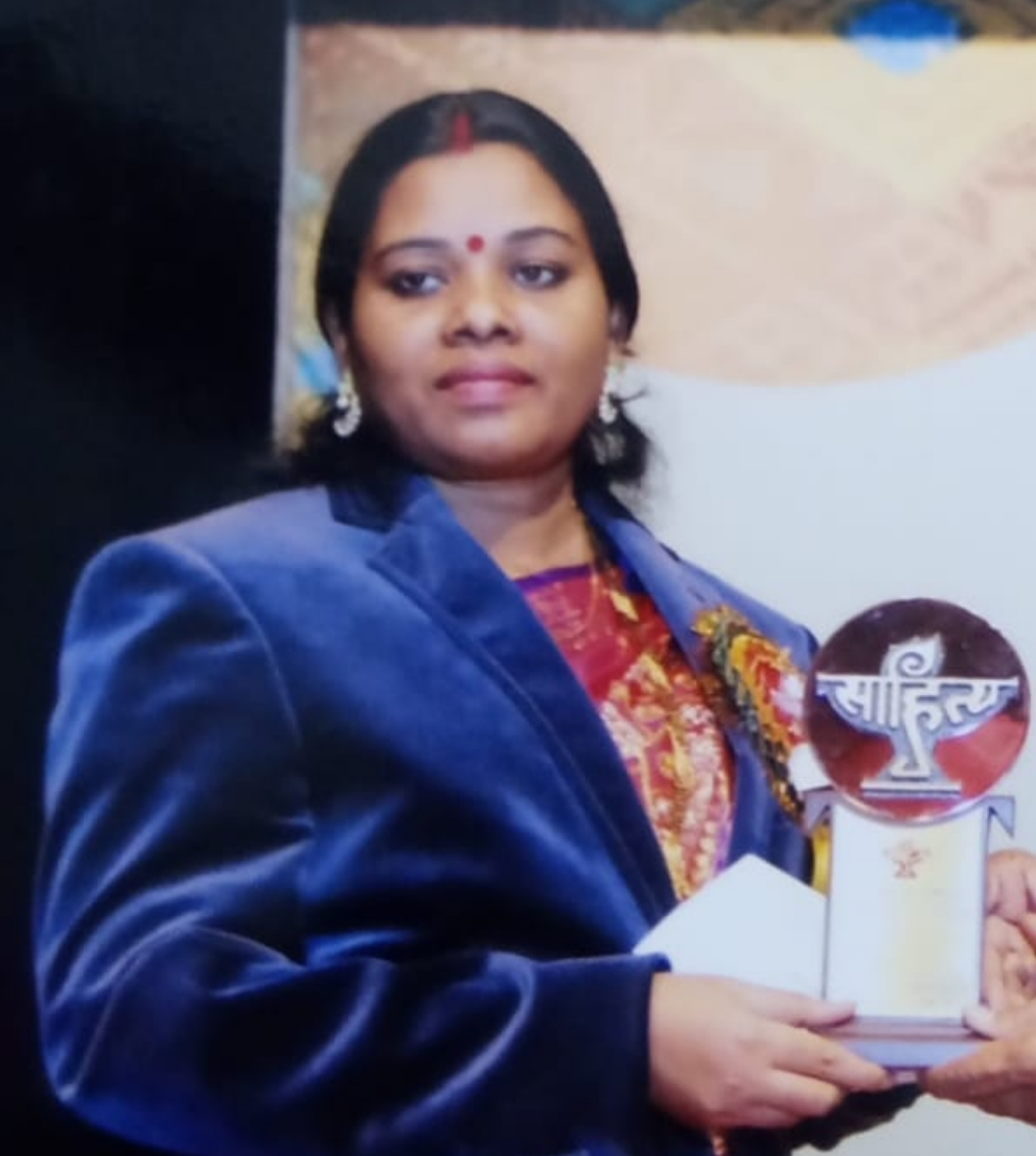
- Born: 1984 (age 41–42); Andharia, Kuliana, Mayurbhanj, Odisha, India
- Occupations: Writer, Homemaker

Maina Tudu (born 1984) is an Indian Santali-language poet, lexicographer, and educator from Odisha. She is best known for her poetry collection Marsal Dahar, for which she was awarded the Sahitya Akademi Yuva Puraskar in 2017. She is an advocate for the promotion of Santali language and Ol Chiki script, and has contributed to Santali digital and literary initiatives.

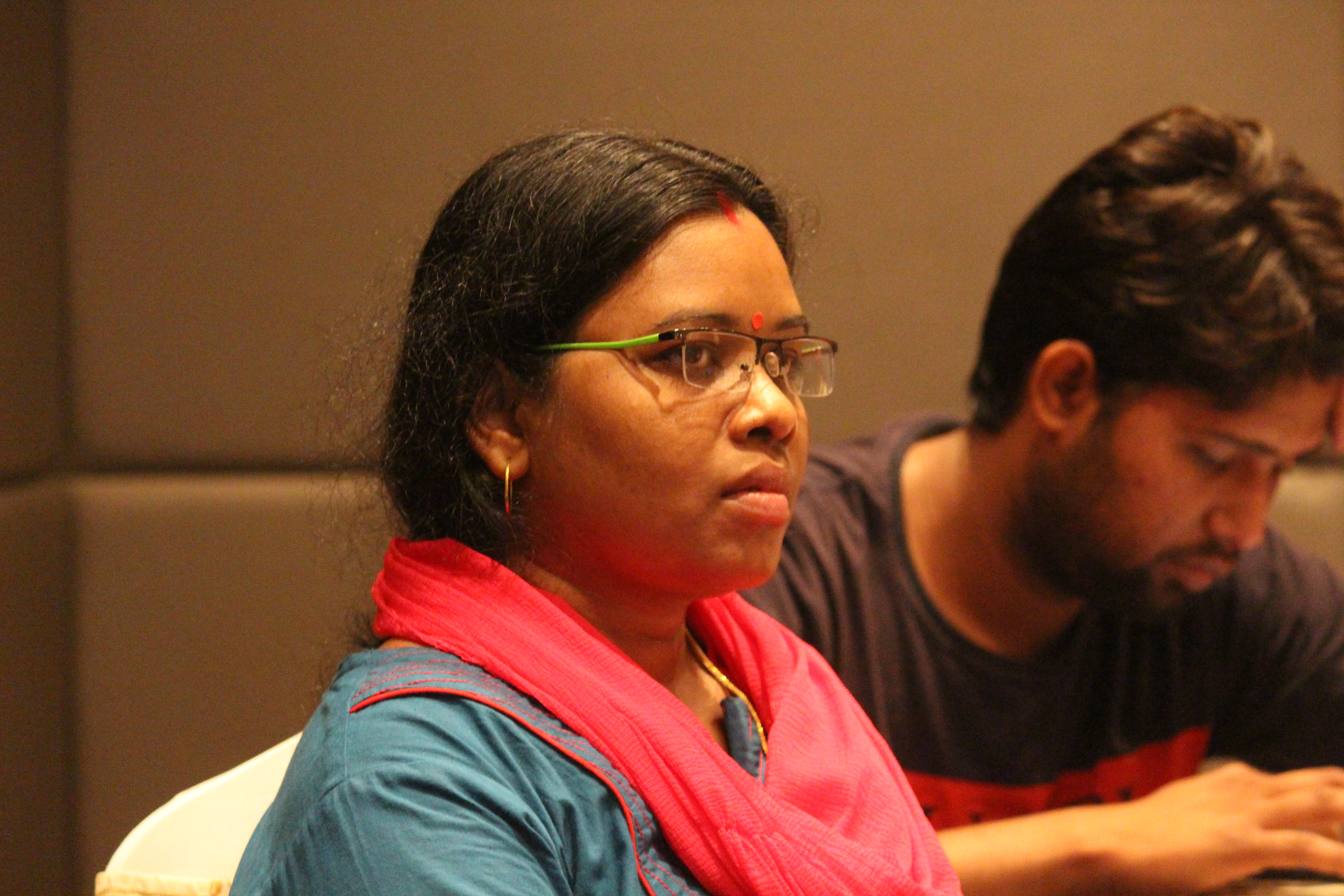
Maina Tudu Introducing Herself at an Event

== Career ==
Tudu began writing poetry at a young age and gained recognition for her contribution to Santali literature. Her poetry reflects themes of identity, indigenous culture, and linguistic pride.

In 2017, she received the Sahitya Akademi Yuva Puraskar for her Santali poetry collection Marsal Dahar.23 She has also authored Ol Chiki Ada Gaban, a grammar book in the Ol Chiki script, aimed at learners and teachers of Santali language.

Tudu is a co-founder of the Santali literary platform Ayo Arang and is an active contributor to the Santali Wikipedia, helping improve access to information in the Santali language.

== Awards ==
Sahitya Akademi Yuva Puraskar, 2017 – for Marsal Dahar (Santali poetry)

== Selected works ==
Marsal Dahar – poetry collection

Ol Chiki Ada Gaban – grammar book on the Ol Chiki script

== Biography ==
Tudu is a graduate in Santali. For her poetry Marsal Dahar she was awarded Yuva Puraskar in 2017.

Tudu also wrote Ol Chiki Ada Gaban.
