= Digamber Hansda =

Indian tribal activist (1939–2020)

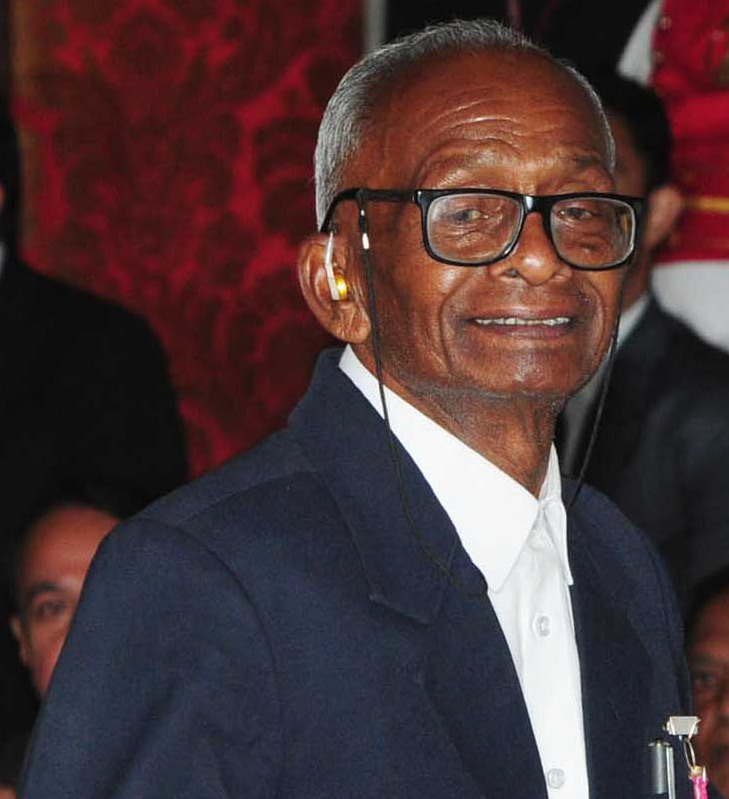
- Hansda at the 2018 Padma Shri ceremony
- Born: 16 October 1939; Ghatshila, East Singhbhum district, British India
- Died: 19 November 2020 (aged 81); Jamshedpur, India
- Occupation: Professor
- Known for: Tribal activism
- Awards: Padma Shri (2018)

Digamber Hansda (16 October 1939 – 19 November 2020) was an Indian academic and tribal activist who worked for the social and economic advancement of the underprivileged communities in West Bengal, Jharkhand, and Odisha. He was a founding member of the Santhal Sahitya Akademi and was considered a pioneer of Santhali language literature.

In 2018, Hansda was awarded the Padma Shri, India's fourth-highest civilian honour, by the President of India for his work in the field of tribal literature and education.

== Early life ==
Hansda was born in Dobhapani village in Ghatshila, East Singhbhum district (now in Jharkhand) on 16 October 1939. His parents were farmers; from a young age, Hansda helped his parents on the farm. He completed his schooling at Rajdoha Middle School and Manpur High School. He obtained a graduate degree in political science from Bihar University (now Ranchi University) in 1963 and a postgraduate degree in political science from the same university in 1965.

== Career ==
Hansda started his career by working as the secretary of the TISCO Adivasi Co-operative Society in the early 1960s. The organization focused on creating job opportunities for tribals in the region, and administered vocational courses to generate employment opportunities. He later worked with Bharat Sevashram Sangh. In his role with these organizations, he helped set up schools in the rural areas near Jamshedpur, including the RP Patel High School, Jugsalai. He also helped introduce Santhali and other tribal languages as a medium of instruction in colleges in the region.

Hansda was a pioneer of the Santhali language literature, and a founding member of Santhal Sahitya Akademi. He developed intermediate, post-graduate and under-graduate courses in the Santhali language under the directive of the state government. He regularly visited villages across Potka and Ghatshila to collect folktales and folksongs from local artists and to compile them to spread awareness of literary works among the tribals. As a member of the central government's Tribal Research Institute, he helped translate academic books from Devanagari script to Santhali. In 1993, he took part in the successful initiative to have Santhali recognized as an official language in Nepal. He also translated the Constitution of India to Santhali language from the Devanagari script.

Through his career, Hansda worked for the social and economic advancement of the underprivileged, with a focus on alleviating poverty, illiteracy, and social evils across tribal communities in Jharkhand, Odisha, and West Bengal. He retired as the principal of the Lal Bahadur Shastri Memorial College, Karandih. As a retired professor, he continued to write columns for newspapers highlighting the plight of the tribal communities.

Hansda held a variety of academic and administrative positions. For instance, he was a member of the management committee of IIM Bodh Gaya, Jnanpith Award selection committee for Santhali language, Central Institute of Indian Languages, Mysore, and the Santhali Sahitya syllabus committee for the Union Public Service Commission (UPSC) and Jharkhand Public Service Commission (JPSC).

== Honours ==
In 2018, Hansda was awarded the Padma Shri, India's fourth-highest civilian honour, by the President of India, Ram Nath Kovind, for his work in the field of Santhali language literature and education. This was followed by the Lifetime Achievement Award conferred by the All India Santali Film Association (AISFA).

== Personal life ==
He was married and had two sons and three daughters.

=== Death ===
He died on 19 November 2020, aged 81, after a long illness at his home in Karandih, Jamshedpur. His wife and one of his daughters had died before him. The Jharkhand State Government announced a state funeral for him.
