= Rabilal Tudu =

Indian Santali writer (1949–2026)

- Born: 21 December 1949; Nowara village, Bardhaman district, West Bengal, India
- Died: 4 June 2026 (aged 76); Barasat, West Bengal, India
- Occupations: Writer; banker
- Awards: Sahitya Akademi Award (2015); Padma Shri (2026)

Rabilal Tudu (21 December 1949 – 4 June 2026) was an Indian Santali writer and banker from West Bengal. He was known for his contribution to Santali literature and was awarded the Sahitya Akademi Award in 2015. In 2026, he was honoured with the Padma Shri, India's fourth-highest civilian award, for his contribution to literature and education.

== Life and career ==
Tudu was born on 21 December 1949 in Nowara village in Bardhaman district of West Bengal. His father was Ramessore Tudu and his mother was Bhasani Tudu. He was associated with both literary activities and the banking profession.

He wrote plays for stage and radio, contributing significantly to Santali drama and literary culture.

Tudu received the Sahitya Akademi Award in 2015 for his play Parsi Khatir.

In July 2022, he was selected to receive the Banga Bhushan award by the Government of West Bengal in recognition of his contribution to Santali literature and culture.

Tudu died at a private nursing home in Barasat, West Bengal, on 4 June 2026, at the age of 76. He had been admitted to the facility due to age-related ailments. Tudu was survived by his wife, a son and two daughters.
