= Shyam Sundar Besra =

Indian writer (born 1961)

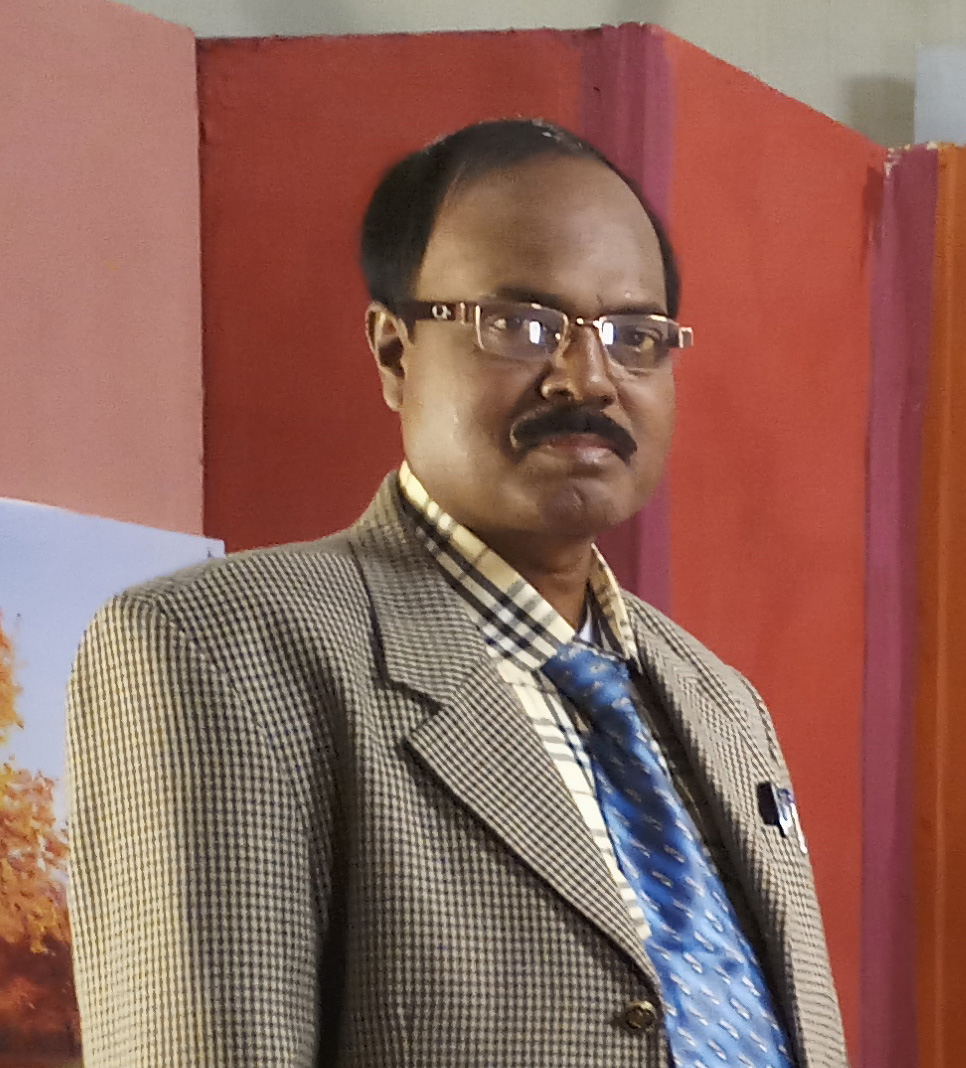
- Born: 12 February 1961 (age 65); Purulia, West Bengal, India
- Other name: Jiwirarec
- Education: Burdwan University
- Occupations: Writer, civil servant
- Awards: Sahitya Akademi Award for Santali (2018)

Shyam Sundar Besra (born 12 February 1961) is an Indian writer of Santali and Hindi. He is also a civil servant from West Bengal. He won the prestigious Sahitya Akademi Award in 2018. His pen name is Jiwirarec.

== Personal life ==
Besra was born on 12 February 1961 in Ramkanali, Purulia, West Bengal, but his native was in Godda. He completed his M.A. in Hindi literature and M.A. in Santhali in 1987. He is the chief inspector of ticket of Eastern Railway Zone's Asansol Division.

== Literary work ==
Besra was awarded Sahitya Akademi Award in 2018 for his novel Marom. Three of his major works are Dullar Khatir, Damin Reyak Judasi Kahani Ko and Damin Kulhi, out of which two are part of syllabus for postgraduate courses in Sido Kanhu Murmu University.

Besra has been associated with All India Radio Bhagalpur, Ranchi and Kolkata. He has also served as the advisory board member for five years in Santali Sahitya Akademi, New Delhi.

== Awards ==
- Dr. Ambedkar Fellowship Award – 1992
- Sammanvaye Shree – 2004
- Rashtriya Sikhar Samman – 2014
- Sahitya Akademi – 2018
