= Aditya Kumar Mandi =

Indian writer of Santali language (born 1974)

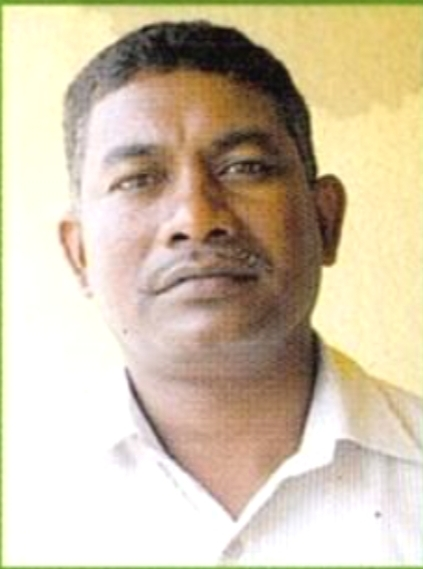
- Born: 19 January 1974 (age 52) vill-Barughutu p.o-chouter ps-sarenga dist-bankuar west bengal pin-722150
- Other names: mandi kishar
- Occupation: service in cisf

Aditya Kumar Mandi is an Indian writer of Santali language. He won Sahitya Akademi Award in 2011. He works in Central Industrial Security Force.

== Biography ==
When Mandi was twelve years old, his parents were excommunicated from their village Burughutu, Bankura because they bought two bighas of land from another farmer. It was happened because, according to their tradition they could only own ancestral land. After this incident they could not talk to anybody, they could not use village well and their land was taken away. One day his father left home and never returned. According to himself this incident inspired him to start writing.

Mandi's first poem was Aam Do Okhal Ka. For his poetry Banchao Larhai he was awarded Sahitya Akademi Award in 2011. As of 2012 he published 14 books in Santhali including an autobiography.
