= Arjun Charan Hembram =

Indian writer and banker (born 1952)

- Born: 1952 (age 73–74); Ghatkuanri, Mayurbhanj, Orissa, India
- Occupations: Writer, Banker

Arjun Charan Hembram is an Indian writer of Santali language and banker from Odisha. He won Sahitya Akademi Award in 2012.

== Biography ==
Hembram was born on 1952 in Ghatkuanri, Mayurbhanj, Orissa. He is the founder-editor of Santali literary magazine Chai Champa. He also brought out Santali fortnightly magazine Bahabonga.

Hembram was awarded Sahitya Akademi Award in 2013 for his poetry Chanda Bonga. Two of his books, Lade Sarjom and Chanda Bonga, are included in the curriculum of North Orissa University and Union Public Service Commission.
