= Kali Charan Hembram =

Indian writer

- Born: 1 May 1960 (age 65); Mayurbhanj, Orissa, India
- Occupations: Civil servant, writer
- Awards: Sahitya Akademi Award for Santali (2019)

Kali Charan Hembram (born 1 May 1960) is an Indian writer of Santali language and civil servant from Odisha. He won the Sahitya Akademi Award for Santali in 2019.

== Biography ==
Hembram was born on 1 May 1960 in Mayurbhanj. He went to school at Bahalda High School. After school he was admitted to Tata College where he graduated. He is working as a section officer at the Council of Higher Secondary Education in Bhubaneswar.

Hembram is involved in writing books, plays and songs in Santali. He wrote the dialogue of a Santali film titled Jiwi Jury.

Hembram is the writer of an anthology of short stories titled Sisirjali. This book was published in 2013. It was his first book that was published. The book consists of 15 short stories. He was awarded Sahitya Akademi Award for Santali for this book in 2019.

== Selected bibliography ==
- Bousoyem Upol
- Dhibur Gating
- Jabor Gansng
- Damadol
- Guligodoriyo
- Saota Sechet
- Nirmoya Dharti
- Timir Sagingre Lo-Beer
- Donmese Barudang Tala Tordang
- Sisirjali
- Sirjon Kahet
