= Selay Soy =

Indian boxer

Personal information
- Full name: Selay Soy
- Nationality: Indian
- Born: 25 October 2001 (age 24)
- Height: 1.54 m (5 ft 1 in)
- Weight: 51 kg (112 lb)

Sport
- Sport: Boxing (46kg, 51kg)

Selay Soy (born 25 October 2001) is an Indian boxer from Jharkhand player of Indian Boxing Federation. He won a medal in the 2017 Asian Junior Amateur Boxing Championships.

== Early life ==
Soy was born to Sh. Durga Charan Soy and Suruaat Soy on 25 October 2011 in the Sitaram Dera, Jamshedpur district of Jharkhand (India).

== Career ==
Soy started his career at a very young age of 16, he made a mark by winning best boxer trophy in the boy's category at Inter-centre Boxing Championship organised by Urban Services Tata Steel at Baridih Community Centre in the year 2014.

== Khelo India Youth Games 2018 ==
Soy represented his alma mater S.B.M. School, Mango, Jamshedpur at first Khelo India Youth Games 2018 held at Indira Gandhi Arena, New Delhi and went on to win gold in 46 kg category in the game of boxing.

== Golden Gloves 2019 ==
Soy was among the four Indian youth boxers clinched silver medals and a bronze at the 37th Golden Gloves of Vojvodina International Tournament held in Serbia in 2019. Soy competed to Omer Ametovic of Serbia and lost by 0-5 and went to earn silver medal.
