= Binita Soren =

Indian mountaineer

Personal information
- Nationality: Indian (India)
- Born: Binita Soren; 21 June 1987 (age 39) Kesorsora, Seraikela Kharsawan district, Jharkhand, India
- Occupation: Mountaineering

Climbing career
- Major ascents: Mount Everest (2012)

Binita Soren (born 21 June 1987) is the first tribal woman to climb Mount Everest, the world's highest mountain peak.

Binita is a native of Kesorsora Village in the Rajnagar block of the Seraikela Kharsawan district of Jharkhand. As part of the Eco Everest Spring 2012 campaign, Binita started her campaign from Jamshedpur on 20 March 2012 along with her two colleagues. On 26 May 2012, at 6.50 am, Binita and Meghlal Mahato, along with Rajendra Singh Pal hoisted the Indian flag on the summit of Mount Everest. The climb was notable for using the northern route to the peak. Binita Soren was a member of Indian Women's First Thar Desert Expedition across the International Border - from Bhuj in Gujarat to Wagah in Punjab covering over 2,000 km in 30 days.

== See also ==
- Indian summiters of Mount Everest
- List of Mount Everest summiters by number of times to the summit
- List of Mount Everest records of India
- List of Mount Everest records
