= Rani Murmu =

Indian Santali-language author (born 1988)

- Born: 1988 (age 37–38)
- Citizenship: Indian
- Occupations: Writer, Engineer
- Writing career
- Language: Santali language
- Subjects: Poetry, Short stories
- Notable work: Hopon mayak kukmu
- Notable awards: Sahitya Academy Yuva Puraskar

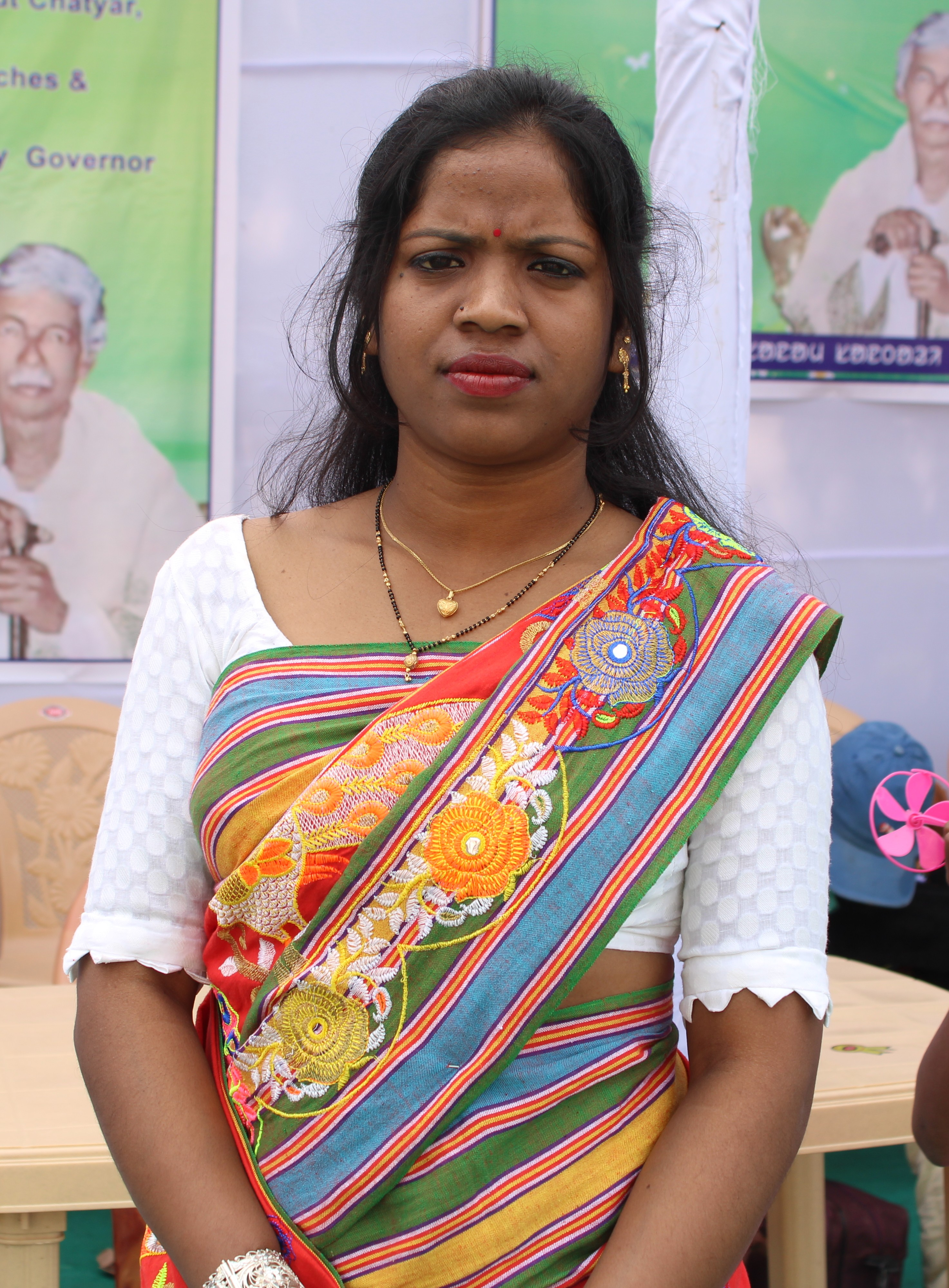
Rani Murmu during an event

Rani Murmu (born 1988) is an Indian Santali eminent writer. She was awarded with Yuva Puraskar by Sahitya Akademi for her book Hopon mayak kukmu in 2018.

== Early life education ==
Murmu was born in 1988 at Deoghar (Birdih), Jamshedpur to Sita Murmu and Budhrai Murmu. She did her graduation from Ranchi University in Political Science in 2011. Her father Budhrai Murmu retired from Swarnarekha Project in the year 2010. They teach children to read and write Santali in Ol Chiki script.

== Writing career ==
Rani has expressed that her interest in writing was sparked by her engagement with social media. In the beginning, she used to write small comments about positive thoughts on Facebook. As her followers began to admire and encourage her, she began to take writing seriously and started crafting stories. Alongside stories, she also penned poems. However, Rani admits to having a preference for storytelling in her writing. According to her, storytelling is an oral tradition among the tribals and is an effective method of communication. While songs and poems are also integral to tribal culture, they lack the narrative element. Both genres have their significance, but Rani's heart lies in storytelling as it allows her to convey messages fascinatingly.
