= Gyarsi Bai Sahariya =

Community activist and local NGO worker

- Born: Faldi, Baran, India
- Died: 13 July 2018
- Known for: Social work

Gyarsi Bai Sahariya was a community activist and local NGO worker. She was from Faldi village of Kishanganj block of Baran district. She worked with Mahila Jagrut Manch, a local non-government organization, to organise women in villages. She mobilised sahariyas to fight for their dues under public ration system. She encouraged sahariyas to join campaign for right to information and employment guarantee.
She led the campaign to end the decades-old practice of debt bondage, a modern-day slavery. She has successfully freed more than 150 laborers and reclaimed 120 acres of their land. She led the community in Sunda to plan the building of grain bank.
The initiative led by Gyarsi Bai has been recognised by The Civil Society Hall of Fame, an initiative by Civil Society magazine, in association with Azim Premji Foundation.

She died on Friday 13 July 2018 due to cardiac arrest.
