= Bajal Soren =

Tribal freedom fighter

Bajal Soren ᱵᱟᱹᱡᱟᱹᱞ ᱥᱚᱨᱮᱱ
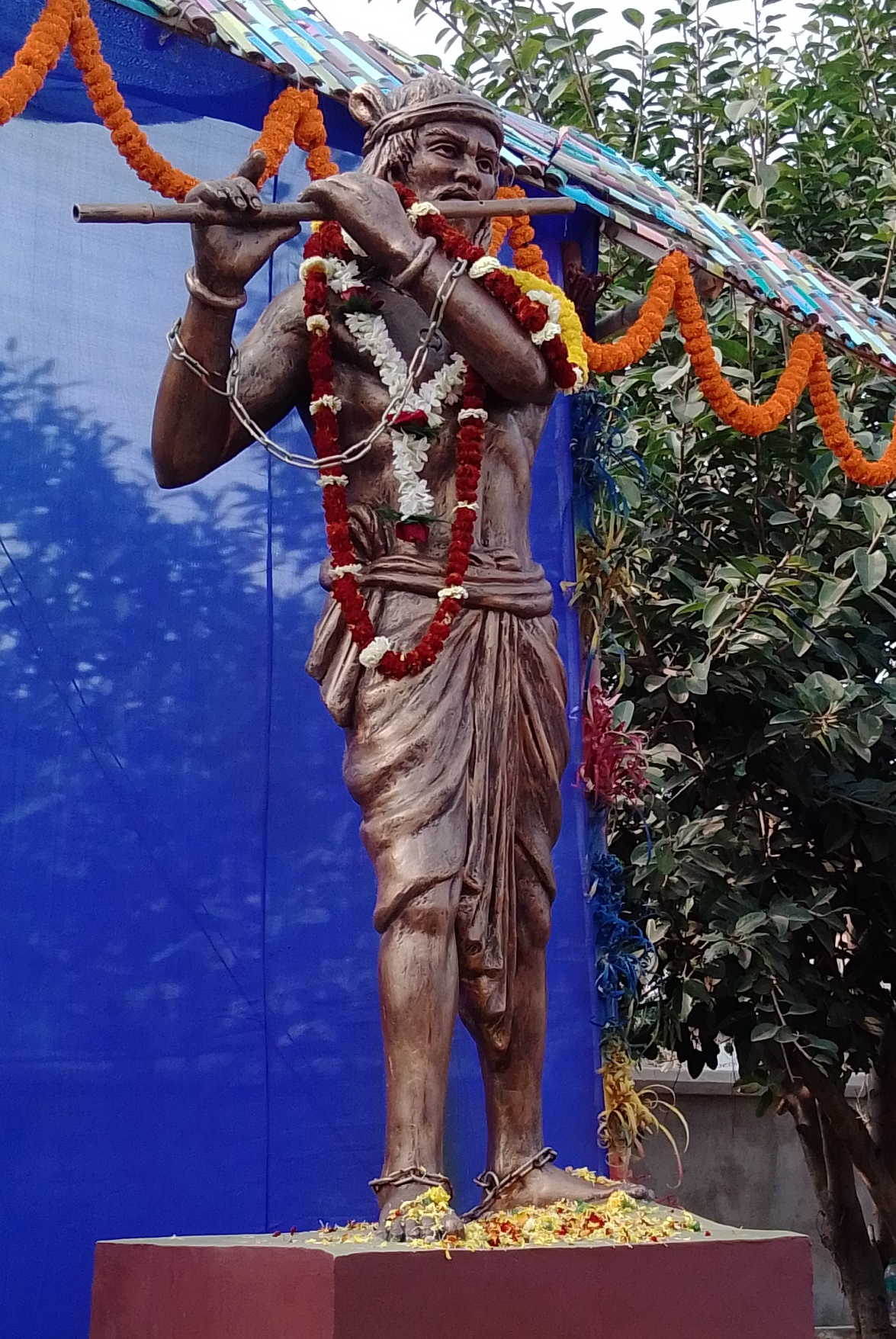
- Statue of Bajal Soren, Abdarpur football field, Borobagan, Suri, Birbhum, West Bengal.
- Born: Sunderpahari, Godda, Bengal Presidency
- Dynasty: Soren
- Occupation: Santal leader, Tribal leader

Bajal Soren also known as Bir Bajal was an Indian freedom fighter from Santal community. Along with the entire Santal community he was also victimized of the atrocities by money lender under British Empire during 1850-55 even before Santal Revolt which took place in (1855–1856).

== History ==
In 1854-55, he conspired and invited Mahajan Rup Singh Tamboli lured him to give all their cattle and land what the owned, during that time in the field he assassinated as retaliation of extreme atrocities on tribal women and heavy revenue collection from the tribal resident of the Santhal Pargana Division which was then in Bengal Presidency. Mahajan Rup Singh Tamboli was a contemporary to Kanwar Ram Bhagat Mahajan. Being caught by the British troops he was brought to Suri in Birbhum, present day west Bengal as he was punished for death sentence by hanging. But, during his execution, he wished to play Santal tune in his flute. The melody fascinated the daughter of the then jailer and she felt in love with him and rescued him.
