= Gomasta Prasad Soren =

20th-century Indian linguist

- Born: 1943 (age 82–83); Udalboni village, Purulia district, West Bengal, India
- Occupation: Writer
- Writing career
- Subject: Santhali Writings

Gomasta Prasad Soren was a Santhali writer, social worker and educator. Akhara Thau was his first notable publication in 1965. Kahis Aarang (pathetic voice), Nonkan geyabon hor (We Santals are like this), Nonkan getabon Samaj (Our society is like this) are few of his notable works.

== Career ==
Soren was born at Udalboni village near Bandwan. His father's name is Gobinda Soren. He started work as Primary School teacher at Madhupur in Purulia district in 1961. His first book, a collection of songs, Hor Sereng Puthi was published in 1960. From 1981 he edited Pondgoda literary magazine. Soren became a member of Adibasi Socio Educational and Cultural Association and also worked with Akhil Bhartiya Jharkhand Party. He engaged with various social work for the Adivasi people with activist Sarada Prasad Kisku.
