= Damayanti Beshra =

Writer and poet

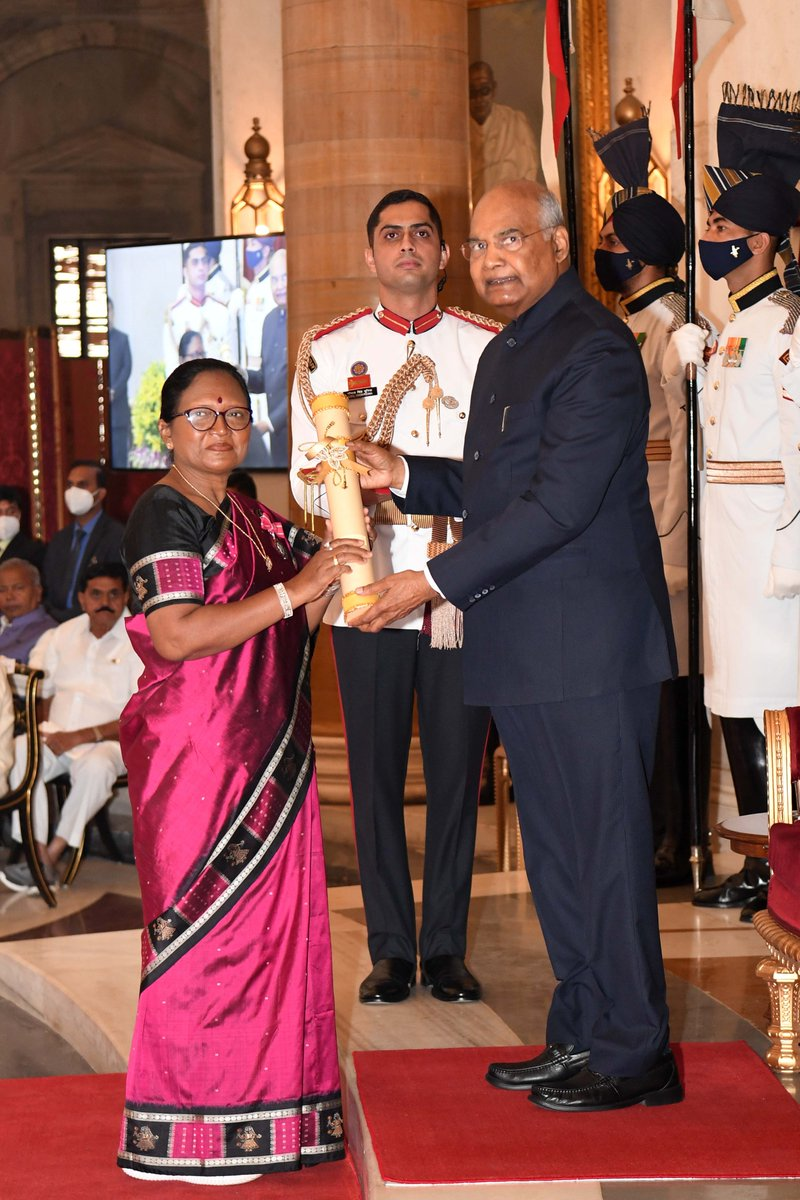
- Damayanti Beshra receiving Padma Shri award from President Ram Nath Kovind
- Born: Dhigij; 18 February 1962 (age 64); Bobeijoda, Mayurbhanj, Odisha
- Education: B.A, M.A, PhD in Odia
- Alma mater: Rama Devi Women's College, Bhubaneswar; Utkal University
- Occupations: Lecturer, Politician
- Known for: Poet and writer in Santali
- Political party: Bharatiya Janata Party, (2024 - Present)
- Spouse: Gangadhar Hansda (m. 1988)
- Parent(s): Rajmal Majhi (Father); Pungi Majhi (Mother)
- Awards: Sahitya Akademi Award; Literature Award
- Honours: Padma Shri

Damayanti Beshra (born 18 February 1962) is a Santali author and Adivasi researcher. She is known for literature of Santali language. In 2020, she was honoured by Padma Shri for her remarkable contribution to Santhali literature.

She was awarded the Sahitya Akademi Award in 2009. She also published the first women's magazine in Santali language called Karam Dar.

She is the first female writer in the language to author and publish an anthology of poems Jiwi Jharna in 1994. She was awarded the Padma Shri in 2020.

== Early life ==
Damyanti Beshra was born on 19 February 1962 in Bobeijoda village in Mayurbhanj district of Odisha as the eldest daughter of mother Pungi Majhi and father Rajmal Majhi. His nickname was Dhigij. According to Santhali tradition, the name was given after her grandmother. Even though there was no school in his village Babeijoda, a local resident used to teach the children in a small shade where she got his primary education. Along with other students, she also learned to write letters on the ground with Chalk. Her paternal uncle was very when he came to know that she was interested in studies and took her and got her admitted in a government school of Deuli village. There she studied till third class. After that, she studied till class 4 and 5 in the school of Chandida, 2 km away from their village. From class 6 to class 11, he studied at T.&R.W. Girls High School, Rairangpur. She passed matriculation there in 1977. As there were no colleges near Rairangpur, she enrolled at Rama Devi Women's University, Bhubaneswar, as an undergraduate. She passed I.A. in 1979 and then graduated in 1981 with honors in Odia. In 1983, she passed M.A.from Utkal University with a special paper in Linguistics.

== Awards and recognition ==
- 2009: Awarded the Sahitya Akademi Award in 2009.
- 2020: Received Padma Shri for her remarkable contribution to Santhali literature.
