= Turia Chand Baskey =

Indian author

Turia Chand Baskey is a Santhali writer and editor. He received Sahitya Akademi Award for Santali literature in 2023.

== Career ==
Baskey hails from Papuria village in Lalgarh, Jhargram. His real name is Taraceen Baskey. He was graduated from Silda Chandra Sekhar College and joined a service under Indian Railway in 1990. Later, he works as a teacher at Babupur Agricultural High School at Sutahata near Haldia. His first poetry book Jala was published in 1993. Baskey edited Tirandaj literary magazine and wrote 31 books in Ol Chiki. In 2015, he received Sarada Prasad Kisku memorial Award conferred by the Santhali Academy of West Bengal. The West Bengal Government awarded him Shikhsaratna in 2023 for his literary contributions. In 2023, Baskey was awarded Sahitya Akademy for his short story collection Jaba Baha.

== Awards ==
- Saradaprasad Kisku Smriti Puraskar (2015)
- Sadhu Ramchand Murmu Smriti Puraskar (2019)
- Shiksha Ratna (2023)
- Sahitya Akademy (2023)
