= Anjali Kisku =

Indian Santali-language writer

- ᱚᱧᱡᱚᱞᱤ ᱠᱤᱥᱠᱩ
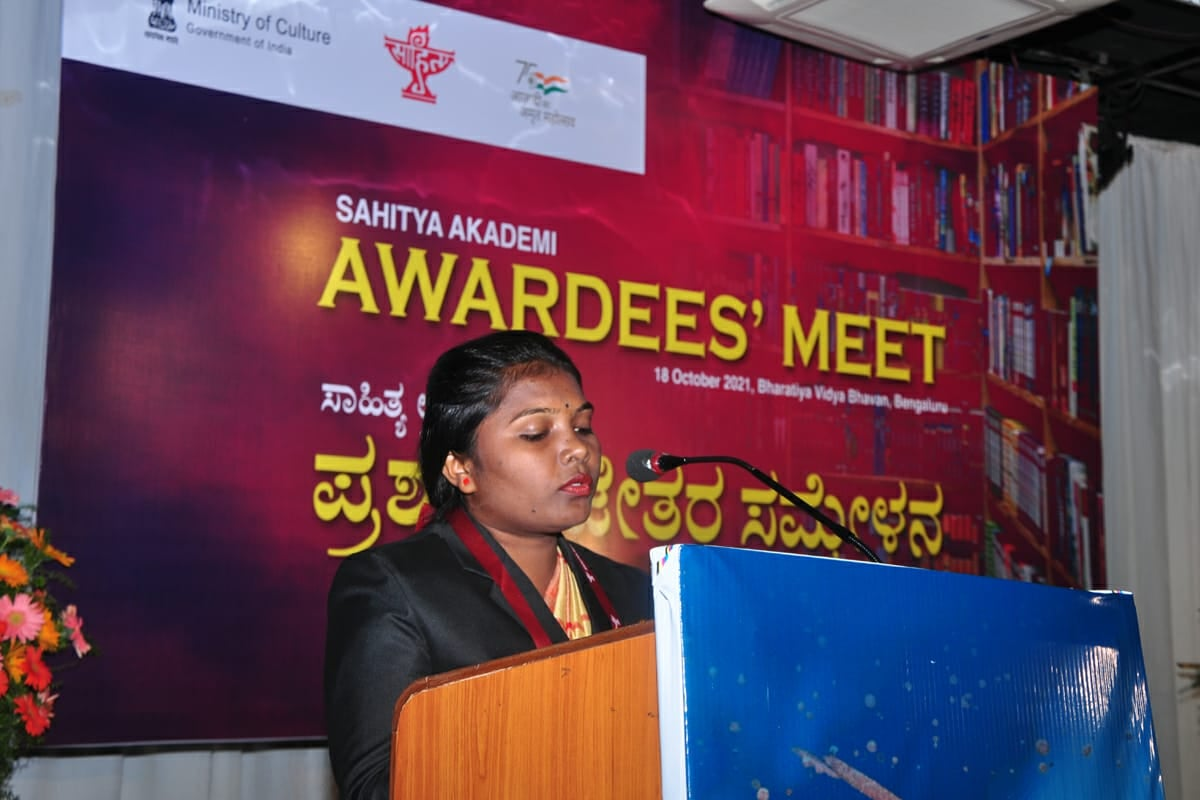
- Anjani Kisku speaking at the Awardees' Meet of Sahitya Academy
- Born: Anjali Kisku; 14 July 1992 (age 34); Bankura, West Bengal
- Education: Graduation and post-graduation in Santal
- Alma mater: Netaji Mahavidyalaya, Arambagh, West Bengal; Visva-Bharati University, Shantiniketan, West Bengal
- Occupation: Educator
- Writing career
- Language: Santal
- Years active: 2018 – present
- Notable works: Anjle (2018), Mid Bita (2020), Ipil
- Notable awards: Sahitya Academy Yuva Puraskar award (2020)

Anjali Kisku is an Indian writer who writes in Santali. She won the Sahitya Academy Yuva Puraskar in 2020 for her poetry book Anjle.

== Early life and education ==
She was born on 14 July 1992. She did her primary education at MP Panchal Girls' High School, Bankura, graduated in Santali from Netaji Mahavidyalaya, Arambagh, Hooghly, West Bengal and post-graduation in Santali from Visva Bharati University. After this, she passed the NET examination which is organised by the University Grants Commission (India) in 2017.

== Career ==
She is a professor at Swami DDK College in Bhara, Bankura, West Bengal. She is a member of the executive committee of the All India Santali Writers' Association.

== Works ==
She has written several books, including the poetry collections Anjle (2018) and Mid Bita (2020), and the short-story collection Ipil. Her works have been featured in various Santali literary magazines, including Sili, Saar, Umul, and Bhabana.
