= Bapi Tudu =

Indian Writer

- Bapi Tudu Receiving Yuva Puraskar in 2023 for his book named Dusi. The book is written in Santali.
- Born: 1998 (age 27–28)
- Occupation: Writer
- Writing career
- Language: Santali language
- Notable work: Dusi
- Notable awards: Sahitya Akademi Yuva Puraskar

Bapi Tudu is an Indian writer. Who writes in Santali. He won the Sahitya Akademi Yuva Puraskar in 2023 for his short stories book Dusi.

Bapi Tudu was born in 1998 at Kadamdiha,West Bengal. He completed his education at a Higher Secondary School located in Gwaltod of Paschim Medinipur district in the year 2021 and He holds Master's degree in Santali with gold medal and has got through the National Eligibility Test and West Bengal SET. In 2023, his first book received the Sahitya Akademi Yuva Puraskar, marking the beginning of a successful writing career.

== Book ==
=== Dusi ===
Dusi is a collection of short stories that excellently portray contemporary Santal society. The stories solemnly ruminate on social evils and make the reader feel the angst emitted by the contemporary social scene. The stories are noteworthy for their racy narrative technique, marvellous characterization, flawless plot construction, and the way they convey the message of humanity. The author's language is masterful, and the imagination in weaving the stories is astonishing. As such, the Sahitya Akademi is pleased to confer its Yuva Puraskar in Santali on Bapi Tudu for his Short Stories Dusi.

== See also ==
- List of Yuva Puraskar winners for Santali
- Turia Chand Baskey
