= Jamadar Kisku =

Indian writer

- Born: 1949 (age 76–77)
- Occupation: Writer

Jamadar Kisku is an Indian, Santali writer from West Bengal. He won the Sahitya Akademi Award in 2014.

== Biography ==
Kisku was born in 1949. He writes, acts and directs plays in Santali at Kherwal Opera, Kolkata. He is also the editor of Tapal, a Santali literary magazine. He lives in Hooghly, West Bengal.

Kisku was awarded the Sahitya Akademi Award in 2014 for his play Mala Mudam.
