= Sarada Prasad Kisku =

Santhali writer

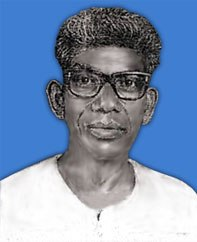
- Born: 1929; Darikadoba Village, Manbazar, Purulia district, West Bengal, India
- Occupation: Writer
- Writing career
- Subjects: Santhali Poems and Short Stories

Sarada Prasad Kisku (born 1929) was a Santhali writer and educator. He was an eminent poet of the Santali literature. He is also well-known for his contribution to Santhali short stories. He is regarded as one of the pioneers in this field. He is very popular in the Santali tribal society for his literary contributions.

He was also a social reformer in the Santhali tribal society. He fought against witchcraft in the Santali society throughout his life. He is regarded as one of the pioneers of the anti-witchcraft movement in the Santhali society.

== Life ==
Sarada Prasad Kisku was born in 1929 in Darikadoba village of Purulia district, West Bengal, India. He is the son of Charan Kisku (Father) and Dhanmuni (Mother). He passed his matriculation in 1948 from the Khatra High School. Later he took the admission for the ISC course in the Ramananda College but was not able to complete his course because of financial problems.

== List of works ==
=== Poetry and songs ===
- Bhurka Ipil
- Kuhubaw
- Gam Gandar
- Lahag Harre
- Bidak Bera
- Sangitika (song)

=== Short stories ===
- Salam Latam
- Morekoturuiko
- Chaora Bhaora
- Kokormet’te

== Awards ==
He was the recipient of many awards for his literary contributions to the Santhali literature.

- Ideal Teacher Award from the President of India (1973)
- Man Sakam by Bharatiya Sahitya Baisi (1973)
- Kavi Ratna from Bikramshila Hindi Vidyapith (1982)
- Jana Jatiya Puraskar by Bihar State Government Rajbhasa Bhibhag (1986–87)
- Gunijan by West Bengal State Government (1989)
- Award of Honour by All India Santhali Writers' Association (1989)
- Hipri-Pipri’ award from Santragachhi Writers’ Association
- Guru Gomke by Santhali Sahitya Parishad Dumka (1998)

== See also ==
- Majhi Ramdas Tudu
- Turia Chand Baskey
