= Majhi Ramdas Tudu =

Santhali writer

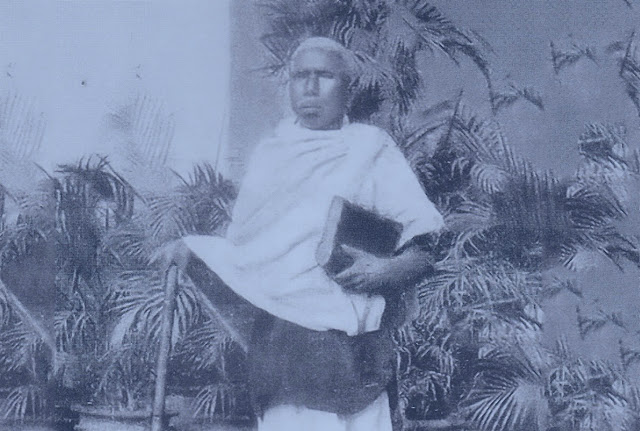
- Born: c. 1854; Karuwakta Village, Ghatshila, East Singhbhum district, Jharkhand, India
- Died: 12 May 1951 (aged 96)
- Occupations: Santali Writer and Poet
- Writing career
- Subject: Santhali Writings
- Notable work: Kherowal Bongso Dharam Punthi(1894)

Majhi Ramdas Tudu (also known as Majhi Ramdas Tudu Reska) (c. 1854—1951) was a Santhali writer and educator. He is the most notable writer in the early period of Santhali literature. He wrote a book on the traditional Santhal rituals, named Kherowal Bongso Dharam Punthi, in 1894. Every religion has its own book about their religion, culture, spiritual thoughts, and their ideas about life. He is the first person who captures the daily life of tribal Santhal peoples in his book. University of Calcutta honored him with the D.Litt title for his contribution to Santali literature and culture.

In 1951, Suniti Kumar Chatterjee translated his book into Bengali script.

== Life ==
Majhi Ramdas Tudu Reska was born in 1854 in Karuwakta village of East Singhbhum district, Jharkhand, India. He is the son of Sitaram Tudu (father) and Manjadari Tudu (mother).
