= Jaher Ayo =

Deity of the Santal, Bhumij, Ho and Munda tribes

- God of creation and life
- Other names: ᱡᱟᱦᱮᱨ ᱟᱭᱳ
- Affiliation: Sarna Dharam; Sari Dharam
- Abode: Jaherthan
- Mantra: Johar Jaher Ayo, Hirla Jaher Ayo (Santali)
- Weapon: Sickle
- Festivals: Sarhul, Baha parab, Sohrai, Mage
- Consort: Marang Buru

Jaher Ayo (Santali:ᱡᱟᱦᱮᱨ ᱟᱭᱳ) or Jahera Mai, is the supreme deity of productivity, prosperity, and the savior of mankind in Sarnaism and Sari Dharam, followed by the native Santal tribal people in India, Bangladesh and Nepal. She is also the consort of the supreme deity Marang Buru. Literally, in Santali Jaher Ayo means ᱡᱟᱝ ᱵᱟᱦᱟ (ᱡᱤᱣᱤ) ᱮ-ᱮᱨ ᱤᱫᱚ ᱟᱭᱳ / ᱜᱚᱜᱚ (Jang Baha E-erid Ayo), which translates to "The Mother of Life."

== Scriptures ==
The details of Jaher Ayo can be found in Jomsim binti, Karam binti, compiled by Dhirendranath Baskey, and Kherwal Bonso Dhorom Puthi.
