= Sarna (place) =

Place for religious activities of followers of Sarnaism

A Sarna is a place of worship for Adivasi groups in the Chotanagpur region of Jharkhand, Chhattisgarh, West Bengal, Bihar and Odisha. It is a sacred grove, where people gather to celebrate local festivals and perform rituals.

== Significance ==
Sarna is a sacred grove of Sal trees and is also known as "Sarai" in Chotanagpur. It is a forested area that is present in the village. According to traditional beliefs, the Sarna is the residing place of the gaon khut (village deity), a manifestation of the founder of the village.

== Ritual ==
Each year people gather to offer sacrifices to Singbonga ("Sun Deity"), Jaher Budhi, Buru Bonga, and to their ancestors, to ensure a good harvest and safety. The village priest in the Chotanagpur region is known as a Pahan or a Laya. The Pahan is assisted by another priest called the "deori". Animal sacrifice, specifically Goat or Hen sacrifice, is a common practice. Cooked meat is eaten with 'tapan' (liquor). Most notably, the festival Sarhul, a spring festival takes place in a Sarna.

Several indigenous peoples, including the Santals, call such practices "Sarnaism", a distinct religion from Hinduism. The Santals, call their sacred groves "Jaher" and their village priest "Naike".

== See also ==
- Jaherthan
- Sohrai
- Mage Parab
