= Maa Dewri Temple =

Hindu temple of Jharkhand, India

- Maa Dewri Diri
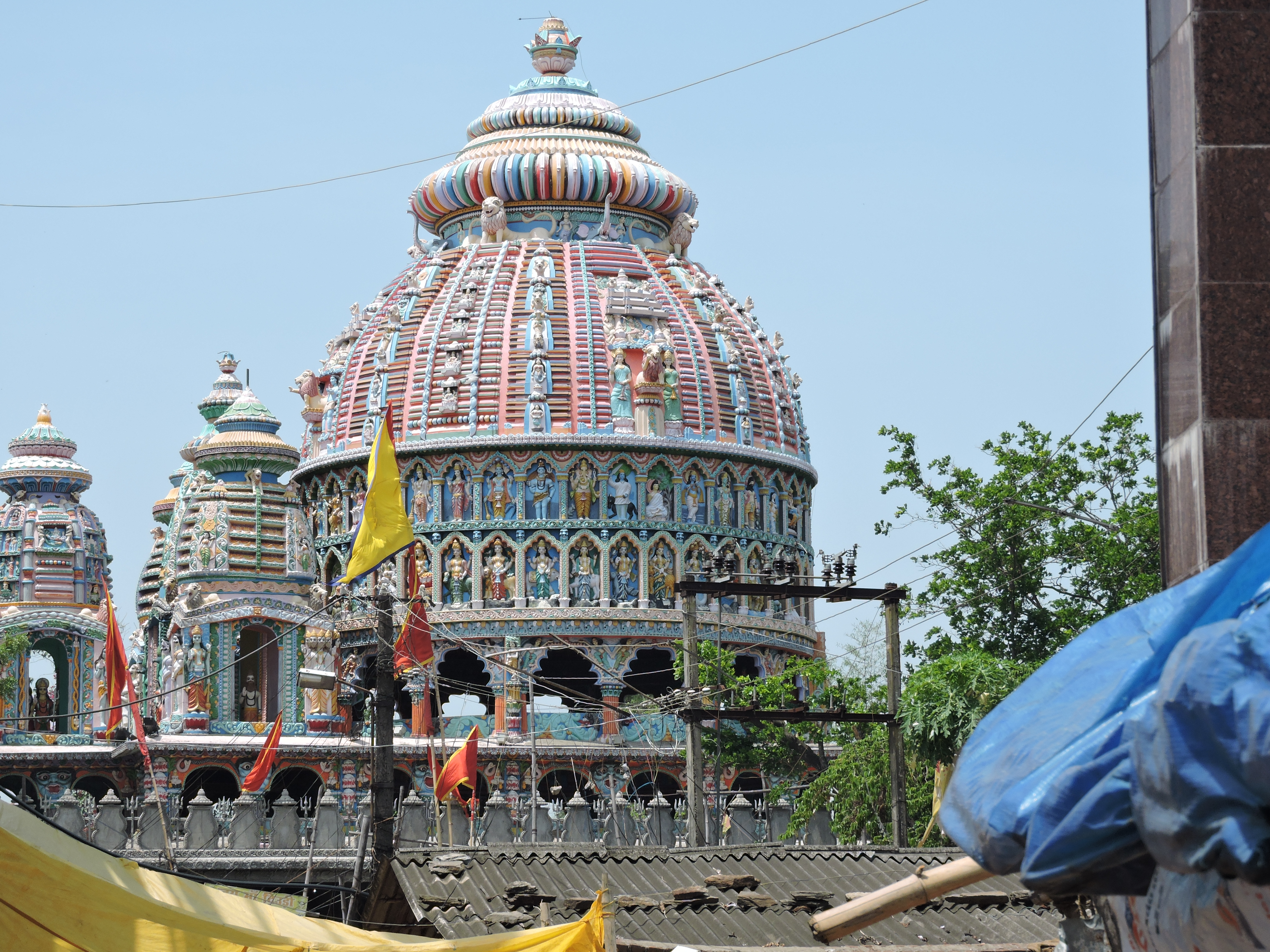

- Location in Jharkhand

Religion
- Affiliation: Sarnaism, Hinduism
- District: Ranchi
- Deity: Maa Dewri

Location
- Location: Diuri village, Tamar, Ranchi, Jharkhand, India
- State: Jharkhand
- Country: India
- Interactive map of Maa Dewri Temple
- Coordinates: 23°02′46″N 85°40′58″E

Architecture
- Elevation: 253 m (830 ft)

Website
- www.maadewrimandir.com

Maa Dewri Temple is an ancient temple, situated in Diuri village, Tamar near Ranchi in Jharkhand in India. The main attraction of the temple is, 700 year old murti of 16-armed village deity Maa Dewri. It is an ancient temple and was renovated few years back. The ancient temple was constructed by interlocking stones without using chalk or binding material. The temple was earlier known as Dewri Diri, meaning sacred stone of Diuri village.

At the temple devotees tie yellow and red sacred threads on bamboo for the fulfilment of their wishes. Upon the fulfillment of their wishes, they again come to the temple and untie the thread. Dedicated to 16-armed Goddess Dewri, the temple is located a little outside the main city of Ranchi. Spread over nearly two acres, this old temple in Ranchi. As per the Legends, whoever has tried to alter the structure of this temple, has had to face the wrath of the gods and suffer consequences. In this temple the goddess is worshiped for six days by the tribal priest, mainly called Pahans and only for one day by the Brahmin Pandas. Located about 60 km from Ranchi, this temple is on the right side of the Ranchi-Tata road, toward the town of Tamar.

== Architecture ==
Before the construction of the temple, the goddess was worshiped in a sacred grove (Sarna) in Diuri village. It is said that the ancient temple was built during 16th to 20th century. The ancient temple was constructed by interlocking stones without using chalk or binding material. The doors of this temple is made up of stone.

A few years ago, a new compound wall was constructed surrounding the ancient temple. Artisans were called from Odisha for its renovation.

== Deity ==
This temple is of the village deity Maa Dewri Devi. Goddess Dewri is a tribal deity and is named after Diuri village, where she resides. The idol of the deity has 16 arms and it is 3 foot tall. Deity is holding bow, shield, flower and param in her arms. Goddess is traditionally worshipped by the Pahan, a tribal priest of the Mundas.

The temple have impact of tribal culture (specially Bhumij and Munda tribes). Tribal musical instruments like Nagara are used during the puja.

== History ==
According to a legend associated with the temple, it was built by an Adivasi king Kera. It is believed that this temple is 700 years old. It is said that this temple was established in year 1300 by King Kera, a Munda king of Singhbhum. Legends say that when the king was returning after losing from the war, he worshiped the goddess at Dewri Diri, the sacred grove (Sarna) of Diuri village. With the blessings of Maa Dewri, he got his kingdom back. Later the king built a temple here and installed the idol of the goddess with sixteen arms. The goddess was traditionally worshiped by a tribal priest, called Pahan.

Later the king of Tamar came to know about the glory of Maa Dewri. Whenever the king came to Diuri to worship, he used to bring along a Brahmin named Chamru Panda. Since then, worship of the Goddess by Brahmin Pandas including Munda Pahans became a tradition here. Pahan used to worship the goddess seven days of the week. Panda was allowed to perform puja only on Tuesdays when he was with the king.

== Gallery ==
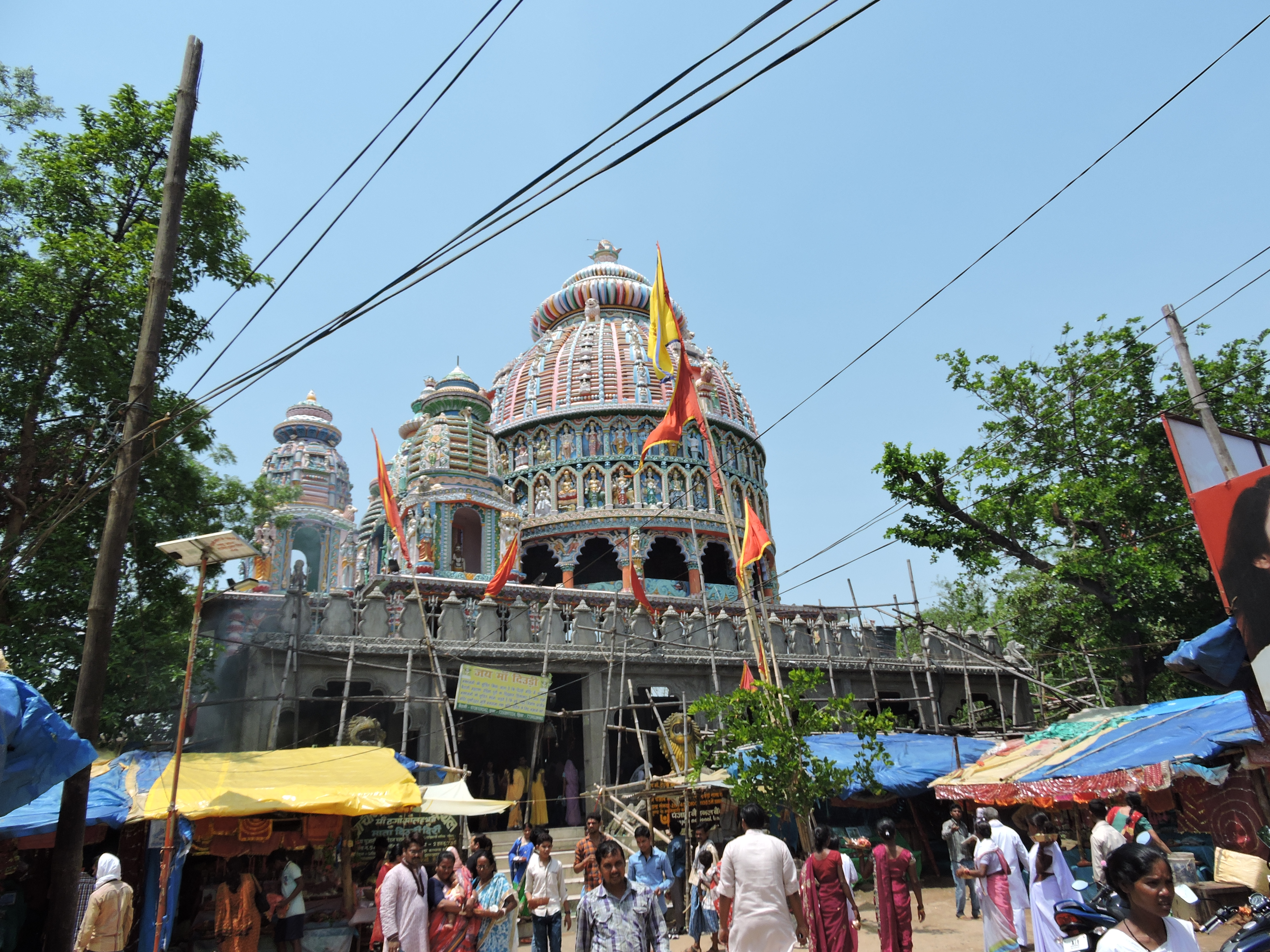
Dewri Temple

== Administration ==
In October 2020, the district administration took over the charge of the temple management after frequent complaints of wrongdoings and lack of transparency in the functioning. It is administered by 13 member committee, which have representatives from administration, 2 public representatives and rests from nearby village's citizens. Before that the temple was run by few priest and some locals, who alleged to mismanagement.
