= Jaherthan =

Sacred grove in India and Bangladesh

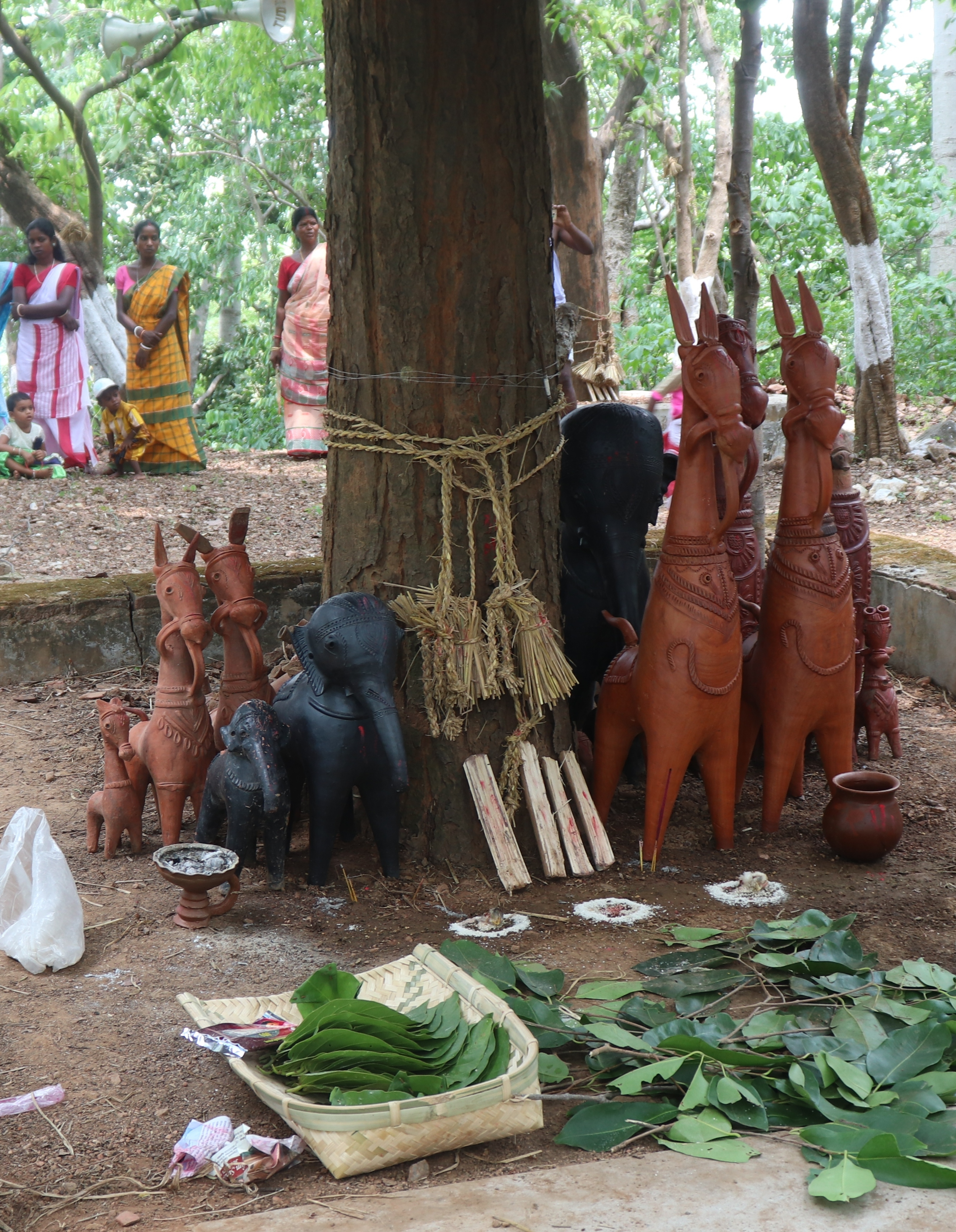

Religion
- Affiliation: Sarna Dharam; Sari Dharam
- Deity: Jaher Ayo, Singbonga, Buru Bonga
- Festivals: Sarhul, Baha parab, Sohrai, etc

Location
- Country: India; Bangladesh

Architecture
- Type: Sacred Grove

Jaherthan, also known as Jahirathan or Jahergarh (Hindi: जाहेरथान, जाहिराथान, जाहेरगढ़), is a sacred grove that is considered the residence of Jaher Ayo and is a worship site for the Santal, Bhumij, Paharia and Bedia tribes in India and Bangladesh. It is a characteristic feature of Bhumij and Santal villages, typically located on the village's outskirts, where many holy spirits reside and where a series of annual festivals take place. The grove is designated during the village's founding and remains undisturbed except during festivals. Inside the grove, a series of uncut stones represent the Bongas (spirits), for which they are not considered substitutes except during festival rituals.

== Religion ==
The Jaherthan is a sacred worship site for followers of Sarna and Sari Dharam, notably the Santal, Bhumij, Bedia and other tribes.

== Role in tribal society ==
Among the Santals and Bhumijs, the Jaherthan is a communal space where the physical and spiritual realms meet and where the Bonga are believed to reside. The Jaherthan is a religious site and also a symbol of tribal identity and ecological consciousness, emphasizing the need to live in harmony with nature. It serves as the focal point for major religious festivals like Baha Bonga, Sarhul, etc. It is here that the village priest, known as Naiki or Laya or Deuri, communicates with the spirits and where the community gathers to reaffirm their social bonds and collective values.
