= Marang Buru =

Deity of the Santal, Bhumij, Ho and Munda tribes

- God of Creation and Destruction
- Other names: ᱢᱟᱨᱟᱝ ᱵᱩᱨᱩ
- Affiliation: Sarna Dharam; Sari Dharam
- Abode: Parasnath; Ajodhya Hills; Dalma Hills
- Mantra: Johar Gosain Marang Buru (Santali)
- Weapon: Ak’ Sar
- Symbols: The Great Mountain
- Festivals: Sarhul, Baha parab, Sohrai, Mage
- Consort: Jaher Ayo

Marang Buru, also written Maran Buru (Santali: ᱢᱟᱨᱟᱝ ᱵᱩᱨᱩ), is a supreme deity of Santal, Bhumij, Ho and Munda tribes residing in India, Bangladesh, Nepal. This creator is variously called Marang Buru (meaning "Supreme Deity" or literally "The Great Mountain") and is regarded as the "cause of all causes," making the tribal religion deeply monotheistic as well as pantheistic. It is a hill, which is considered a deity by the Santals.

== Worship and Rituals ==
Marang Buru doctrines are found in the both Sarna Dharam and Sari Dharam. The deity is worshipped by tribal priests known as Naike among the Santal, Laya or Deuri among the Bhumij, Pahan among the Munda, and Dehuri among the Ho tribes.

The local hills and mountains positioned below the supreme hill deity, Marang Buru.

== Scriptures ==
The worship and holy hymns praising Marang Buru have been compiled in Kherwal Bonso Dhorom Puthi by Majhi Ramdas Tudu, Jomsim Binti Itikatha by Somai Kisku, Karam Binti compiled by Dhirendranath Baskey, Jomsim Binti and Karam Binti compiled by Kanhailal Tudu, among others.

== Dispute ==
The dispute surrounding Marang Buru (Parasnath Hill) in Jharkhand is a century old one, between the Santal Adivasi and Jain communities over religious rights, cultural practices, and land usage. Jains revere the hill as Sammed Shikharji, where 20 of their 24 tirthankaras attained nirvana, and have established over 40 temples there. In contrast, the Santals worship the hill as the abode of Marang Buru, their supreme deity, and consider it the most sacred site in their animist tradition. The conflict dates back to 1911, when the Swetamber Jain community attempted to legally prohibit Santal hunting rituals, a move rejected by British colonial courts, which upheld the Santals’ customary rights. Post-independence policies, including the designation of the hill as a wildlife sanctuary in 1978, further restricted Adivasi rights over the land. In 2023, the Ministry of Environment, Forest and Climate Change issued a directive banning meat, alcohol, and other intoxicants within a 25-kilometer radius of the hill, affecting 99 primarily Adivasi villages. The Jharkhand High Court upheld this ban on May 3, 2025, directing the state government to enforce it and increase security to ensure compliance. While the Jain community views these measures as essential to preserving the sanctity of the site, the Santal community continues to assert their traditional rights, with local organizations filing counter-petitions and celebrating their religious festivals despite mounting restrictions.
