= Somai Kisku =

Indian writer and linguist

- Born: 25 February 1959 (age 67); Basantapur village, Barddhaman, West Bengal, India
- Occupations: Ideologist, writer, and Santal Spiritualism
- Writing career
- Subject: Sari Dharam

Somai Kisku (born 1959) is an Indian writer in Santali language.

== Notable works ==
- Tapal, a quarterly Santali literary magazine, started publication under his supervision. This magazine carried the excellence of Santali literature.

== Awards and honours ==
- Kisku was recently honoured with the prestigious Tagore Literature Awards 2010, instituted by Samsung in collaboration with Sahitya Akademi. He received this award for his work Namalia, first published in 2008. Namalia describes and depicts the lifestyle of the Santal people of 'Namal'. Based on facts, it tells the story of the migration of these people to the rich paddy-growing region of 'Namal' due to the construction of a dam on the Kansavati river.
- He has also received Sharada Prasad Smriti Puraskar from Paschimbanga Santali Academy, Govt. Of West Bengal, India.

== Organisation ==
In 1988, he founded the Hooghly Zila Santali Sahitya Parisad, later renamed Santali Sahitya Baisi. He has led the organization since its establishment.

== Biography ==
Somai Kisku was born on 25th February 1959 at Basantapur, a small village, under the Purba Bardhaman district of West Bengal in the peasant family of Rasiklal Kisku and Fulmani Kisku. He is the third son of his parents among their ten children. He received his early education from Basantapur Gourmohan Primary School and then studied at Jamalpur Higher Secondary School. Later he was admitted to Boinchigram Bihari Lal High School in the ninth class and passed Higher Secondary in 1976. He obtained a bachelor's degree from Haripal Vivekannda College, under the University of Burdwan in 1981. Thereafter he joined as an Inspector in the Department of West Bengal Essential Commodities Supply Corporation. He retired after completing his long service career in 2019.

In the late eighties, extreme poverty, illiteracy, daily life struggles and the experience of the real situation at that time led him to begin to write.
