= Bharat Jakat Majhi Pargana Mahal =

Tribal social organisation

Bharat Jakat Majhi Pargana Mahal,registered
- ᱵᱷᱟᱨᱚᱛ ᱡᱟᱠᱟᱛ ᱢᱟᱹᱡᱷᱤ ᱯᱟᱨᱜᱟᱱᱟ ᱢᱚᱦᱚᱞ
- Abbreviation: BJMPM
- Founder: Nityananda Hembram (Former IIT, Kharagpur & University of California, Berkeley U.S.A and Chief of Architecture, Ministry of Defence, Government of India.)
- Type: Traditional Social Institution
- Registration no.: S0022799 of 2021-22
- Headquarters: Regd Office- Raghunathpur, PO- Nayasarai, PS- Mogra, Hooghly, West Bengal, PIN- 712513, India
- Services: Socio education Development, Socio philosophy Development, Socio Economic Development
- Official language: Santali, English, Bengali, Hindi, Odia
- Disam Pargana (India): Rabin Tudu
- Disam Jaga Pargana (India): Parmeshwar Mandi
- Disam Paranik (India): Chandramohan Mandi
- Disam Godet/President (India): Dr. M Saren
- Website: bjmpm.org

Bharat Jakat Majhi Pargana Mahal (Santali: ᱵᱷᱟᱨᱚᱛ ᱡᱟᱠᱟᱛ ᱢᱟᱹᱡᱷᱤ ᱯᱟᱨᱜᱟᱱᱟ ᱢᱚᱦᱚᱞ) is an Indian social organisation dedicated to the socio-educational, socio-philosophical, socio-economic, and socio-cultural development of the Santal community.

== Working region ==
Bharat Jakat Majhi Pargana Mahal gained popularity in Bihar, Orissa, Jharkhand, West Bengal, Assam of India as well as various parts of Bangladesh, Nepal, Australia, America.

== Description and traditional designations ==
The Majhi word has been traditionally designated to the 'head of a village'. Similarly, the Pargana title has been endowed to a Santal person who is heading and leading the Santal inhabited groups of villages and hamlets. In short, this is a group of all Majhi, Jog-Manjhi (the deputy village headman), Godet (represents the adivisor to the Manjhi), Naike (represents the village priest), Pargana and Paranik (village judge) of the Santal Adivasi inhabited villages and community around the world mostly in the Asian subcontinent.

== YouTube channel ==
Bharat Jakat Majhi Pargana Mahal also operates a YouTube channel named Pargana Arang, which is a Santali language referring to the 'Voice of Santal leading person of the Santal tribe community'.

== Conferences and activities ==
Bharat Jakat Majhi Pargana Mahal organises frequent conferences and seminars for the awareness of Santal tribe. The organization also organises frequent activities to draw the attention of the State as well as Central government for the upliftment of the dwindling Santal. It is also involved in the conservation of traditional culture, rural management, promotion of education in Santali Ol Chiki script from nursery to post-graduation and research level in several universities, conservation and official demand of Sari Dharam religious code for Santal tribe. It believes in worshiping Marang Buru and Jaher Ayo for the well-being of humanity.
