= Rathin Kisku =

Indian singer (born 1984)

- Rathin Kisku
- Born: 22 March 1984; Gopalnagar, Birbhum, West Bengal, India
- Occupations: Singer; lyricist; composer
- Awards: Lal Sukra Award 2008, West Bengal Government; Birbhum District Baul Award 2009; Santali Film Fair Award 2010

Rathin Kisku is an Indian singer. His style of music is between Baul and traditional Santal music, which earned him the nickname "Adivasi Baul".his diptimaan Banerjee

== Life and work ==
Kisku was born in a Santal family in a small village near Santiniketan. The area is influenced by Rabindranath Tagore, who lived in Santiniketan. His former home is now a museum and attraction for tourists. Santinitekan is also considered one of the centers of Baul. During his school years, Kisku frequently participated in local cultural events. He dropped out of school without a degree, but was able to get vocal training in classical Hindustani. Kisku eventually pursued graduation from school. Kisku published his first CD in 2007 at the Goethe-Institut in Calcutta. Previously, he was the lead singer on the Ghosaldanga Bishnubati Adibasi Trust. Kisku has released more CDs with music publisher Saregama in India.

In Europe, he became known in 2005 due to a performance at ARTE. In 2005 and 2008, he undertook concert tours through (Germany) and Austria with the support of Martin Kämpchen. During the first of these trips, he also appeared on the Swiss radio DRS 2. In 2007, Kisku undertook a concert tour to Bangladesh, where he appeared in Dhaka together with Anusheh. This concert tour was again supported by the Goethe-Institut. In 2008, he was the main performer for the ceremony of the Santhali Filmfare Awards. Kisku has appeared repeatedly in Indian radio and television programs. The singer is married and lives in Bolpur.

Kisku fuses Santal music with more mainstream Indian music styles.

Recently he performed in New Delhi in front of 10,000 people on 6 January 2019.
