= Lungi Panchi Dance =

Dancing style of Santals in West Bengal

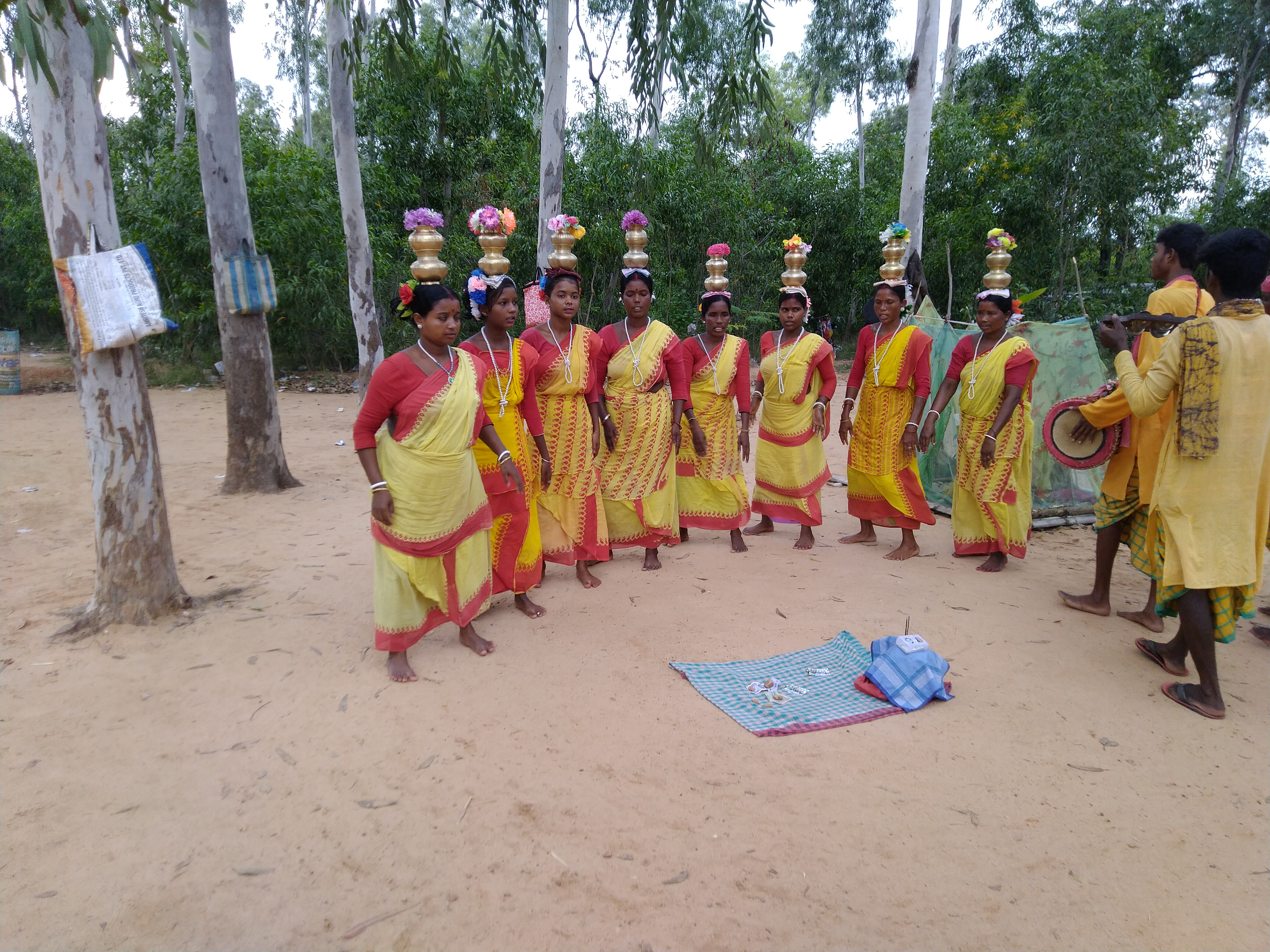
- Lungi Panchi Dance Birbhum, West Bengal
- Origin: Bengal, Birbhum, Purulia District

The Lungi Panchi Dance is a traditional dancing style of the Santal people of West Bengal. This dance is performed by both men and women and is accompanied by traditional music.

== Santals ==
The Santal people are a Munda ethnic group with a very large presence in India and Bangladesh. A large portion of the Santal people come from West Bengal, Jharkhand, and Bangladesh. The Santal tribe has a rich cultural lineage and they display immense solidarity despite their cultural diversity. Dancing and music are central components of their culture. Their population is around 6 million, and geographically located in India, Bangladesh and Nepal. They speak Santali and follow Hinduism largely. Remnants of primitive communal relations are preserved in the social system. The main occupation is agriculture; they are also engaged in hunting and gathering. Many Santals work on plantations, factories, coal mines, and as port workers.

== Dance style ==
The origin of Lungi Panchi dance is unclear. Traditionally, it is believed that it originated in 1955 as a result of mixing the rhythms of merengue and conga in Cuba. The Cuban musician, Eduardo Davidson, is often called the father of the pachanga dance, but opponents of this opinion consider such statements to be erroneous, since the first composition of Davidson in this style was written only in 1959.

When dancing, Santal women dress in a lungi-panchi or red-bordered white sari, which is the origin of the Lungi Panchi dance's name. The male Santhali dancers dress in dhoti and use accessories such as turbans, tree leaves, flowers, and bushes during the dance.

A notable feature of the Lungi Panchi dance is the harmony of movement. Female dancers stand in a line holding hands and move to the rhythm of the madal while Santal men provide the musical accompaniment.

== Instruments ==
The Lungi Panchi dance is accompanied by folk music and various traditional instruments such as the madal, flute, dhamsa, jhanj, kartal, and the shehnai. The men and boys use two types of drums - the madal and the lagra.
