= Sarnaism =

Indian religion

- Flag used by the followers of Sarnaism
- Type: Ethnic religion
- Classification: Animism
- Scripture: Oral tradition
- Theology: Nature worship
- Priest: Pahan, Naike, Deuri & Others
- Region: India
- Language: Kurukh & North Munda
- Territory: Chota Nagpur Plateau
- Origin: 1930s
- Members: 4,957,467
- ^{#}Sarnaism is a syncretic religious identity encompassing diverse indigenous traditions; theology, religious structure, and practices vary among tribes and localities.

Sarnaism is a religious faith of the Indian subcontinent, predominantly followed by indigenous communities of the Chota Nagpur Plateau region across states such as Jharkhand, Odisha, West Bengal, Bihar, and Chhattisgarh.

The essence of the Sarna faith revolves around nature worship. Its core principles emphasize jal (water), jaṅgal (forest) and jamīn (land), with adherents offering prayers to trees and hills while believing in the protection of forests. This belief centres around the reverence of Sarna, the sacred groves of village communities, where the village deity, known as Gram Deota, resides, and where sacrificial offerings are made twice a year. It is also referred to as "Sarna Dharma" or the "Religion of the Holy Woods", and it holds the distinction of being India's largest tribal religion.

== Etymology ==
The term "Sarna", derived from the Mundari language, means "sacred grove" and refers to the sacred grove where tribal religious practices take place. It is etymologically related to the name of the Sal tree. However, the term for a sacred grove varies among tribes; for instance, the Santals and Bhumijs call it Jaherthan, the Oraons call it Kurukh Kuti, and the Hos call it Desauli.

== History ==
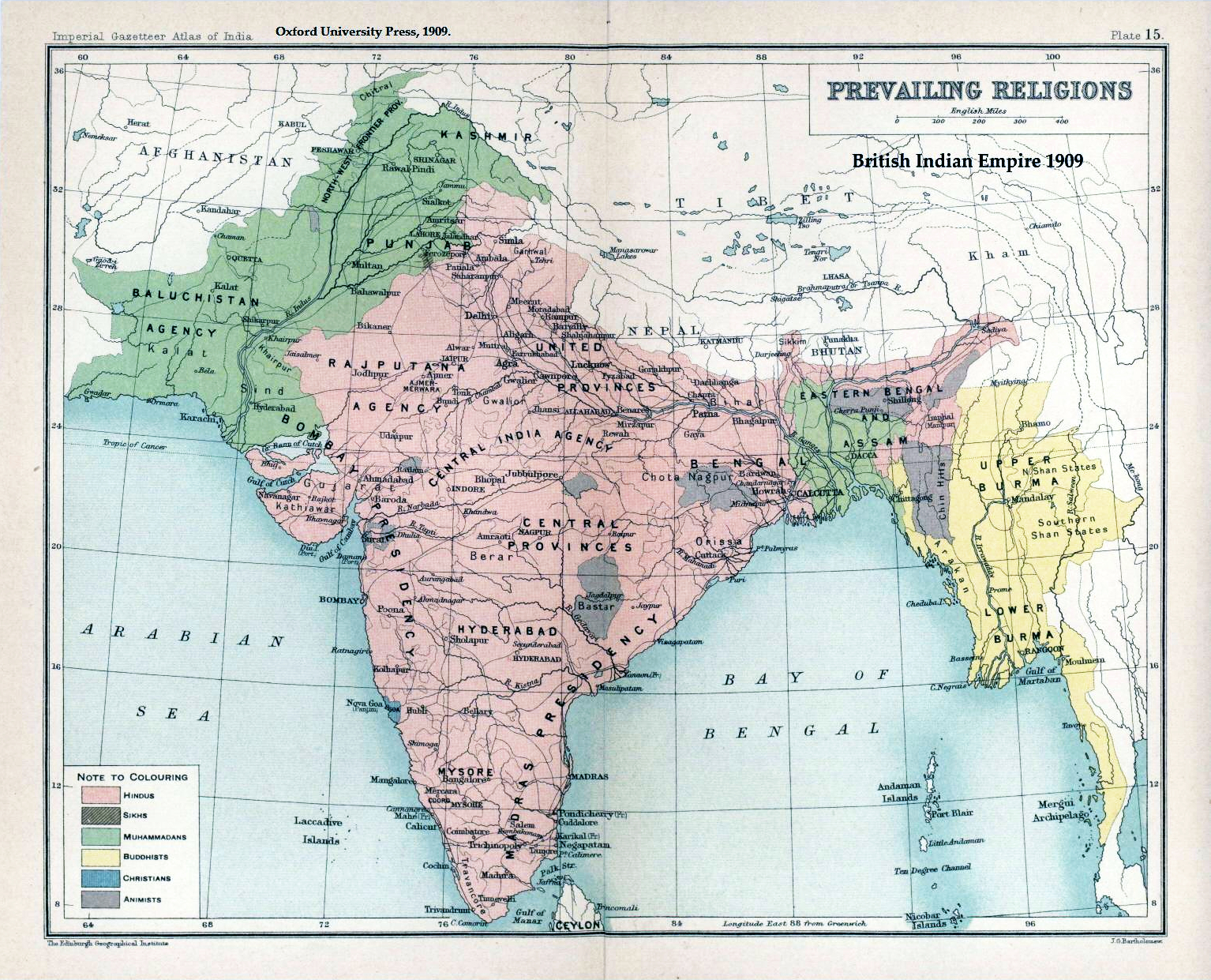
Prevailing religion of British India, 1901 Census.

The socio-political movements that emerged among the tribal communities of the Chota Nagpur region in the late nineteenth century, such as the Birsa Munda movement, the Tana Bhagat movement, and the Dupub movement, shaped a collective tribal consciousness. Though their primary focus was on autonomy in response to colonial expansion, these movements also addressed the preservation of ancestral practices and belief systems by resisting external religious influences. This period laid the foundation for ethno religious identity among tribals, with emerging expressions such as Marangburu practices and Kherwarism among the Santal, Dupub faith among the Ho, early articulation of Sarna and Birsaite path among the Oraons and Mundas.

Ethnic religious affiliation in Jharkhand, 1901–2011.

Distribution of Sarnaism in India, 1961 Census.

Sarnaism, as a religious identity, emerged in the 1930s, following the assertion of a collective indigenous identity as Adivasi by tribal activists in the Chota Nagpur region of erstwhile Bihar. They articulated a unifying religious identity for the diverse, nature based ancestral practices of tribal communities, with the purpose of asserting Adivasi distinctiveness from mainstream religions of India such as Hinduism, Christianity, or Islam. However, initially, the unifying concept was prevalent among the Oraons of erstwhile Ranchi under the ethno-religious term Adivasi. Later, the Oraon, Munda and Ho communities accepted the Mundari ethno-religious term Sarna to represent their religious identity. It gained broader acceptance through socio-political development associated with leaders such as Jaipal Singh Munda, Raghunath Murmu, and Kartik Oraon. Post-independence, the religion experienced steady growth, incorporating diverse tribal communities into its fold, including larger tribes like the Santal, who had initially refrained from accepting its tenets but gradually aligned with it over the following decades. Politically, Sarnaism grew alongside the Jharkhand movement, formulated by the Adivasi Mahasabha and its offspring political organization, the Jharkhand Party, which was centered on the motifs of tribal identity and the demand for autonomy. The movement culminated on 15 November 2000, the birth anniversary of Birsa Munda, when the tribal-concentrated southern region of Bihar was bifurcated to form the separate state of Jharkhand.

== Theology ==
The adherents of Sarnaism believe in, worship, and revere a village deity as protector of village called Gaon khunt, Gram deoti, Marang Buru, Singbonga, or by other names by different tribes. Adherents also believe in, worship, and revere Dharti ayo or Chalapachho Devi, the mother goddess identified as the earth or nature.

== Practices ==
Sarna worshippers following their religious rites

Sarna is a place of worship, which is a sacred grove in Chotanagpur. It is called Jaher than or Jaher gar among Santal people, and can be found in villages. Sal trees are in the sacred grove. The ceremonies are performed by the entire village community at a public gathering, with the active participation of village priests, known as pahan and assistant pujar in Chotanagpur. A priest is called naike by the Santal. The sthal typically has multiple trees, such as sal, mahua, neem, and banyan.

Sarna groves are strictly protected. Cutting down trees, harming wildlife or taking resources from within the grove boundary are customarily forbidden, assuring biodiversity conversation through faith.

The main festival of Sarnaism is Sarhul, a festival in which devotees worship their ancestors. During the festival, the pahan brings three water pots to the sarna. If the water pots drop in level, they believe the monsoon will fail; if they stay the same, the monsoon will come as normal. Men then offer sakua flowers and leaves.

== Demographics ==
Historical population
Year	Pop.	±%
1951	240,558	—
1961	428,687	+78.2%
1971	951,558	+122.0%
1981	1,391,178	+46.2%
1991	1,820,454	+30.9%
2001	4,075,246	+123.9%
2011	4,957,467	+21.6%
Note: In 1981 and 1991 census, the religion 'Sarna' was recorded as 'Swarna'. Source: Census of India

Adherents of Sarna, 2011 census
1. Santal (30.5%)
2. Oraon (21.4%)
3. Ho (17.9%)
4. Munda (12.5%)
5. Bhumij (1.72%)
6. Lohra (1.70%)
7. Mahali (1.07%)
8. Kharia (0.87%)
9. Bedia (0.67%)
10. Other "Scheduled Tribes" (4.42%)
11. Other Backward Classes and Non-Scheduled Communities (7.37%)
The statistics show solely Sarna adherents, without consideration of Sari Dharam or other denominations claimed to be synonymous.

According to the 2011 census of India, the Sarna religion counted 4,957,467 followers in India, primarily in the eastern states of Jharkhand (83.33%), Odisha (8.14%), West Bengal (8.13%), Bihar (0.21%), and Chhattisgarh (0.16%), with smaller numbers of followers in Assam (301), Punjab (190), and Madhya Pradesh (133). Scheduled Tribes comprise the majority of believers at 92.60%, while Other Backward Classes and Non-Scheduled Communities accounted for 7.39%. The Santal (30.48%), Oraon (21.35%), Ho (17.87%), Munda (12.48%), Bhumij (1.72%), Lohra (1.70%), Mahali (1.07%), Kharia (0.87%), and Bedia (0.64%) are the primary followers. While the rest 4.42% tribal followers belongs to Kisan, Kolha, Gond, Kharwar, Chik Baraik, Asur, Bhinjia, Karmali, Kora, Kol, Kawar, Birja, Mal Paharia, Savar, Birhor, Gorait, Parhaiya, Lodha, Chero, Khanwar, Suria Paharia, Mundari, Baiga, Korwa, Sounti, Binjhwar, Nagesia, Mahli, and various generic tribes.

Additionally, there are 506,369 followers of Sari Dharam in India, primarily followed by the Santal tribe of West Bengal, representing 94.43% of the total Sari Dharam adherents. The religious denomination, which often considered as synonyms or sect of Sarnaisim.

== Politics ==
=== Religious status ===
Adivasi communities in the Chota Nagpur region have traditionally practised diverse indigenous religious traditions centred on nature, ancestral beliefs and sacred sites, in coexistence with neighbouring Hindus. The spread of Christianity in the region introduced another belief system among them. Distinctions between Christian and non-Christian Adivasis subsequently became a point of contention. For instance, Jaipal Singh Munda advocated equal constitutional safeguards for Christian and non-Christian Adivasis, whereas Kartik Oraon introduced a bill in Parliament to exclude Christian Adivasis from the Scheduled Tribes list. Christian and Hindu organisations have also competed over the religious identity of Adivasi communities. Since 1947, Hindu groups, including the Rashtriya Swayamsevak Sangh (RSS) affiliated Vanavasi Kalyan Ashram, have promoted Hindu religious practices and institutions in tribal areas, a form of religious outreach pursued by Christian organisations since British rule.

Sarna activists have criticised these efforts, contending that both Hindu and Christian organisations seek to subsume Adivasi religious traditions within larger religious identities. They maintain that Sarnaism comprises distinct beliefs and practices and should not be regarded as a branch of Hinduism or Christianity, and demand a separate religion code for Sarnaism in the Census of India.

=== Census code ===
The first census of India was conducted in 1872 under British rule and has been held every ten years since 1881. In the colonial censuses, Adivasi communities not affiliated with established religions were enumerated as a homogeneous ethno-religious residual category under labels such as "Aborigines", "Animists", "Tribal Religion" and "Primitive–Tribes". Post-independence censuses, conducted under the Census Act, 1948, shifted to the recording of individual declarations of religious identity. Six established religions (Hinduism, Islam, Christianity, Buddhism, Sikhism and Jainism) are assigned numerical codes from one to six, while an open field records residual other beliefs as declared, which are tabulated under "Other Religions and Persuasions" (ORP) for statistical and administrative purposes. Successive censuses have recorded hundreds of regionally and socio-politically varied entries in the open field, with reported followers ranging from a few hundred to several lakh. Activists contend that the absence of a dedicated code has fragmented the Adivasi community, leading to its assimilation into Hinduism and Christianity and weakening its distinct identity.

The demand for a Sarna code originated in Chotanagpur. It was raised by the All India Adivasi Conference in March 1941. The conference, led by Jaipal Singh Munda, petitioned the Governor of Bihar, Thomas Alexander Stewart, to record Adivasis as "Sarnapujaris". In the subsequent census, 10.24% (378,774) of Adivasi respondents in Jharkhand were recorded as Adivasi and 6.4% (237,310) as Sarna, followed by other ethno-religious identities such as Ho, Munda, Kharwar and Santal. The nomenclature, however, remained contentious and was largely confined to the Oraon, Munda and neighbouring communities because of their socio-cultural affiliations. The Santals, for example, refrained from adopting it in its early stages, but it gained acceptance through Raghunath Murmu, who established the Sarna Dharam Semlet in 1953 and urged the Santals to register as Sarna in government documents. In recognition of his efforts, Jaipal Singh Munda conferred on him the title "Guru Gomke" at the All India Sarna Conference in 1956. Murmu subsequently shifted his writings from Kherwarism to Sarnaism to foster a broader cultural identity, while another section of the Santals, holding a divergent view, coined the term Sari Dharam in West Bengal. In the 1960s, in view of internal diversity, Kartik Oraon and Ram Dayal Munda conceptualised the inclusive term Adi Dharam to unite Adivasi communities of indigenous faith under tribe-specific categories such as Adi Dharam (Oraon), Adi Dharam (Munda), Adi Dharam (Ho) and Adi Dharam (Santal). Several similar regional ethno-religious movements emerged in Chotanagpur, but Sarna gained prominence over the course of the Jharkhand autonomy movement.

The demand has remained politically contested since its inception. Adivasi activists have advocated for it on grounds of cultural identity, and Christian Adivasi groups have supported it on some occasions, while Hindu organisations such as the RSS have opposed it, citing demographic polarisation. The demand intensified after the formation of Jharkhand. In 2020, the Jharkhand Mukti Morcha-led state government passed a resolution seeking a separate Sarna code in the census. Owing to concerns over nomenclature, the accompanying bill was titled the "Sarna/Adivasi Religion Code Bill, 2020". In 2022, the Trinamool Congress-led West Bengal government passed a similar resolution seeking recognition of Sari and Sarna. The Union government, which is responsible for conducting the census, has not agreed to the demand, citing the religious diversity of Adivasis in India.

== Organisations ==
- Akhil Bharatiya Sarna Dharam (ABSD)
- All India Sarna Dharam Mandowa (AISDM)
- Kherwal Saonta Semled (KSS)
- Bharat Jakat Majhi Pargana Mahal (BJMPM)
- Adivasi Socio-Educational and Cultural Association (ASECA)
- Kendriya Sarna Samiti

== See also ==
- Hinduism
- Indian-origin religions
- Tribal religions in India
- Hindu denominations
- Sacred groves

== Bibliography ==
=== Books ===
- Alam, Shamsher; Nayak, Kumari Vibhuti (2023). ""Sarna Adivasi" Religion Code: Contextualizing Religious Identity of Tribals in India". Interdisciplinary Perspectives on Sustainable Development. CRC Press. pp. 262–266. ISBN 978-1-032-60104-5.
- Sharma, Mukul (2022). ""Come Let Us All Play": Sacred Groves, Sarna, and "Green" Politics in Jharkhand, India". In Coggins, Chris; Chen, Bixia (eds.). Sacred Forests of Asia – Spiritual ecology and the politics of natural conservation. Routledge. doi:10.4324/9781003143680-5. ISBN 9781003143680. LCCN 2021054055.
- Virottam, Balmukund (2020). Religious History of the Chotanagpur Tribes: (Sarna Dharam to Christianity). Himalaya Publishing House. ISBN 978-93-90515-60-8. OCLC 1320817862.
- Borde, Radhika (2017-08-07). "The Sarna Movement in Jharkhand". In Nag, Sajal (ed.). Force of Nature: Essays on History and Politics of Environment (1 ed.). Routledge. pp. 165–178. doi:10.4324/9781315141688-9. ISBN 978-1-315-14168-8.
- Minahan, James (2012). Ethnic Groups of South Asia and the Pacific: An encyclopedia. Ethnic Groups of the World. ABC-CLIO. ISBN 978-1-59884-659-1.
- Niketan, Kishor Vidya (1988). The Spectrum of Tribal Religion in Bihar: A study of continuity & change among the Oraon of Chotanagpur.
- Hembram, Phatik Chandra (1988). Sari-Sarna (Santhal religion). Mittal Publications. ISBN 8170990440.
- Hembram, P.C. (1982). "Return to sacred grove". In Singh, K.S. (ed.). Tribal Movements in India. Vol. II (2006 reprint ed.). Manohar.
- Sachchidananda, A.K. (1980). Elite and Development. New Delhi: Concept Publishing Co. ASIN B000MBN8J2.

=== Journal articles ===
- Srivastava, Malini (2007). "The Sacred Complex of Munda Tribe" (PDF). Anthropologist. 9 (4): 327–330. doi:10.1080/09720073.2007.11891020. S2CID 73737689.
