= Tudu =

Tudu may refer to:

== People ==
- Tudu (surname), Santhali surname in India, Bangladesh & Nepal.

== Places ==
- Tudu, Estonia, a settlement in Estonia
- Tudu, Ghana, a place in Accra, Ghana
- Tudu, Iran, a village in Iran
