= Marandi =

Marandi is a surname commonly found in India or Iran. In Iran, it indicates origins in the town of Marand in northern Iran, west of Tabriz.

- Alireza Marandi, Iranian physician
- Babulal Marandi, Indian politician
- Evi Marandi, Italian-Greek actress
- Javad Marandi, British businessman
- Louis Marandi, Indian politician
- Mehdi Marandi, Iranian volleyballer
- Mohammad Marandi, Iranian academic
- Stephen Marandi, Indian politician
- Tala Marandi, Indian politician
- Som Marandi, Indian politician
- Sudam Marandi, Indian politician
