= Baha parab =

Spring festival celebrated in India

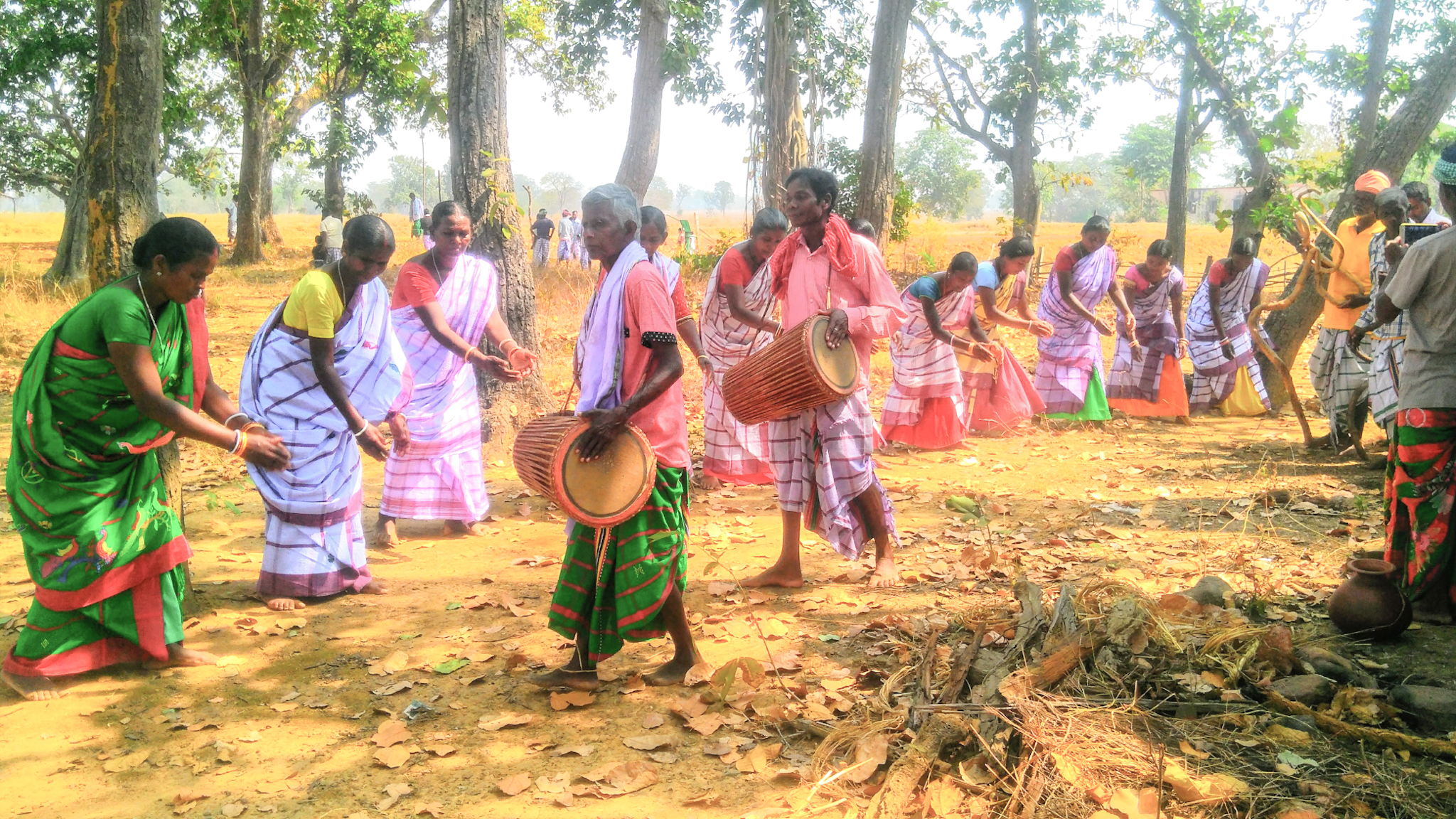
Baha parab dance by women

Baha parab, also known as Baa parab, is a spring festival celebrated by the Ho, Santhal, Munda and other tribal communities in India. The word "Baha" or "Baa" means flower. During Baha parab, men, women and children dress in traditional attire, offer flowers to the deities Marang Buru and Jaher Ayo, and celebrate with the beating of Madal and Tamak (drums) while dancing in traditional tribal style.

== Celebration ==
Marking the festival, the naike or deuri (the priest) performs a ritual. A kula with flowers and leaves of the Sal tree is offered at the Jaherthan (the altar), and devotees pray to Jaher Era, the deity.

After performing the rituals, the naike, along with others, goes from door to door with the kula to bless everyone. People in the household, particularly young girls or women, offer food to the naike. As he is welcomed by a family, his feet are washed with water as a sign of respect.

After the rituals, the second part of the program begins with dances and songs.

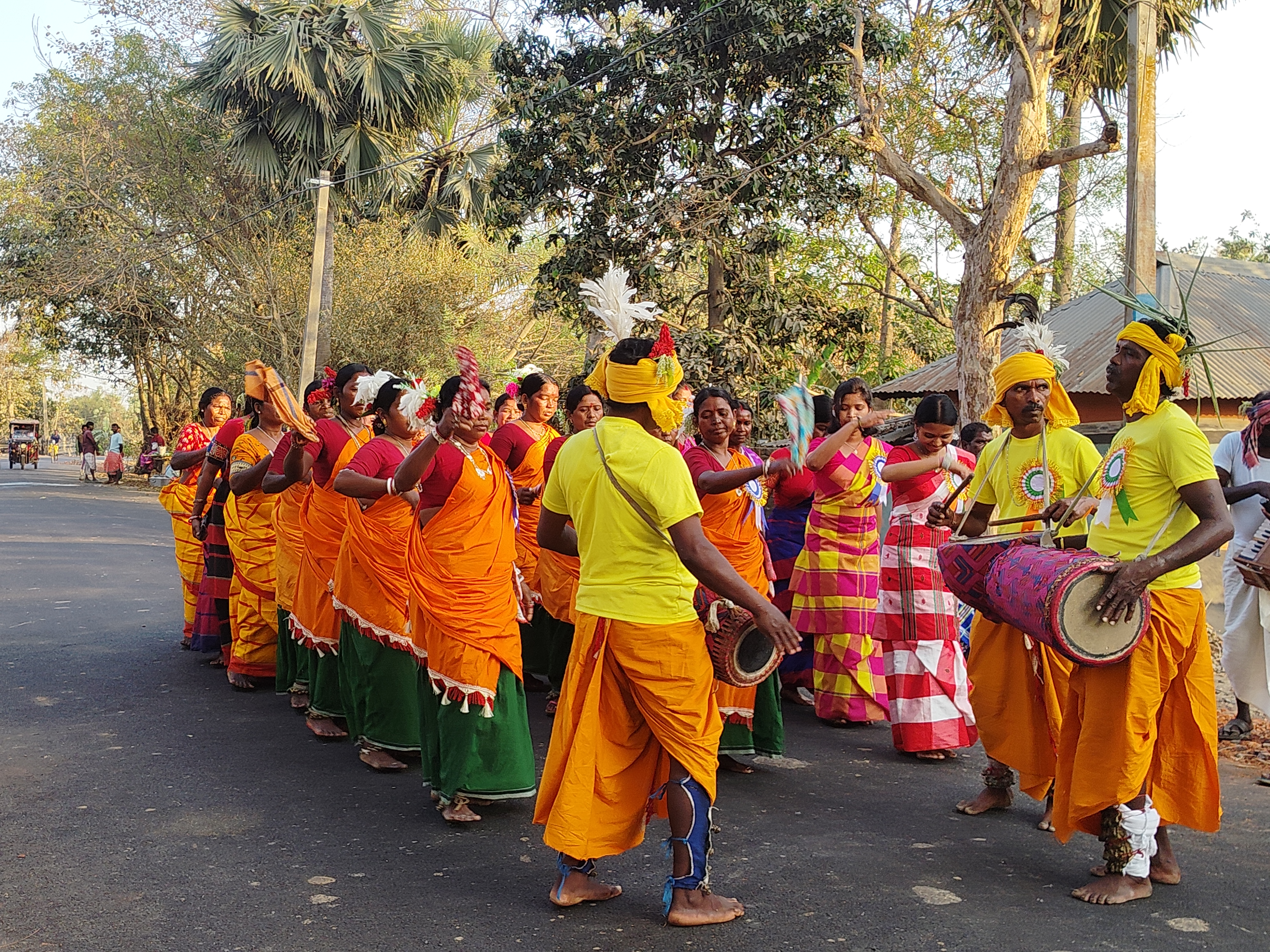
Baha festival in Birbhum

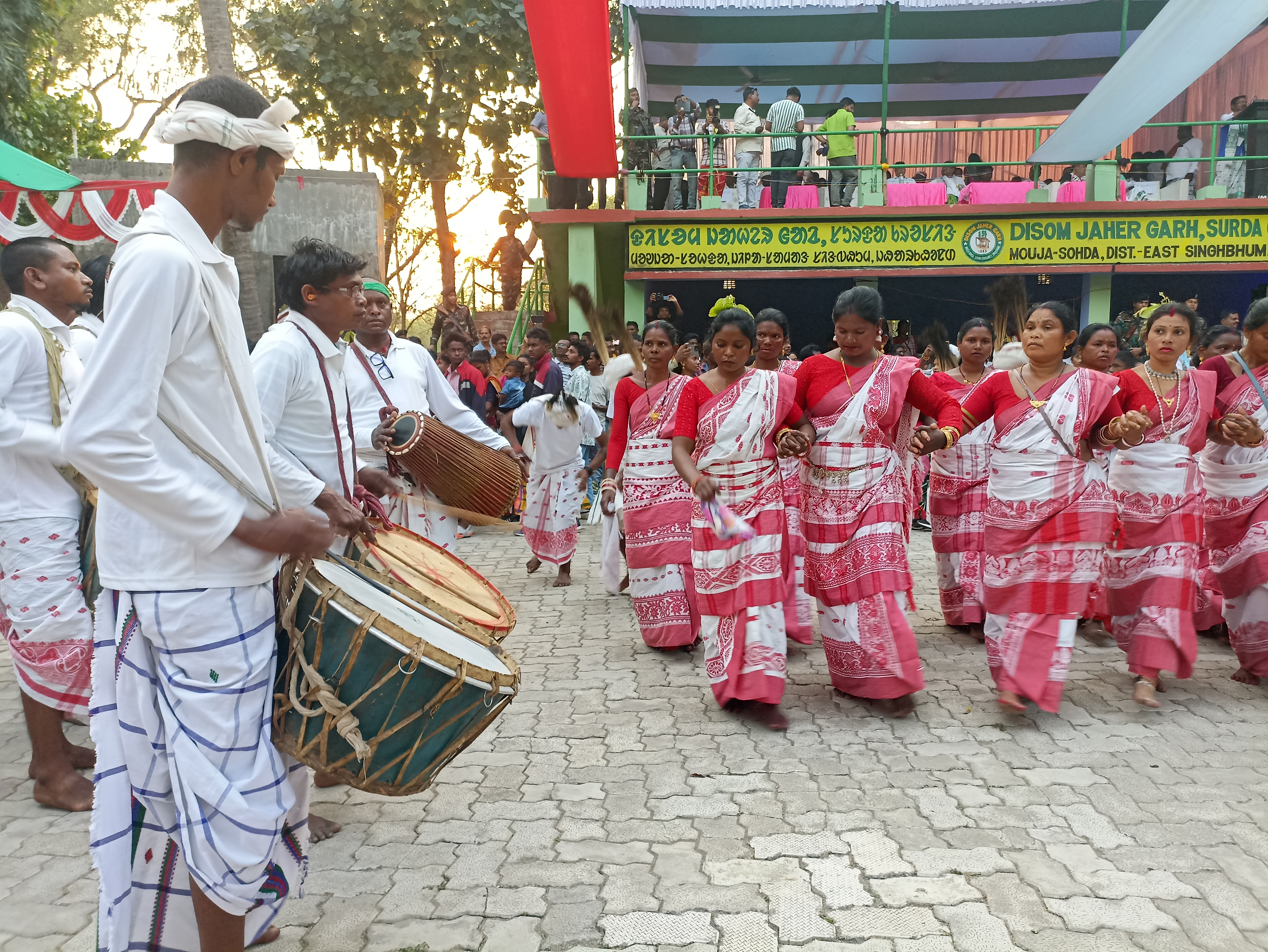
Baha Parab in Jharkhand

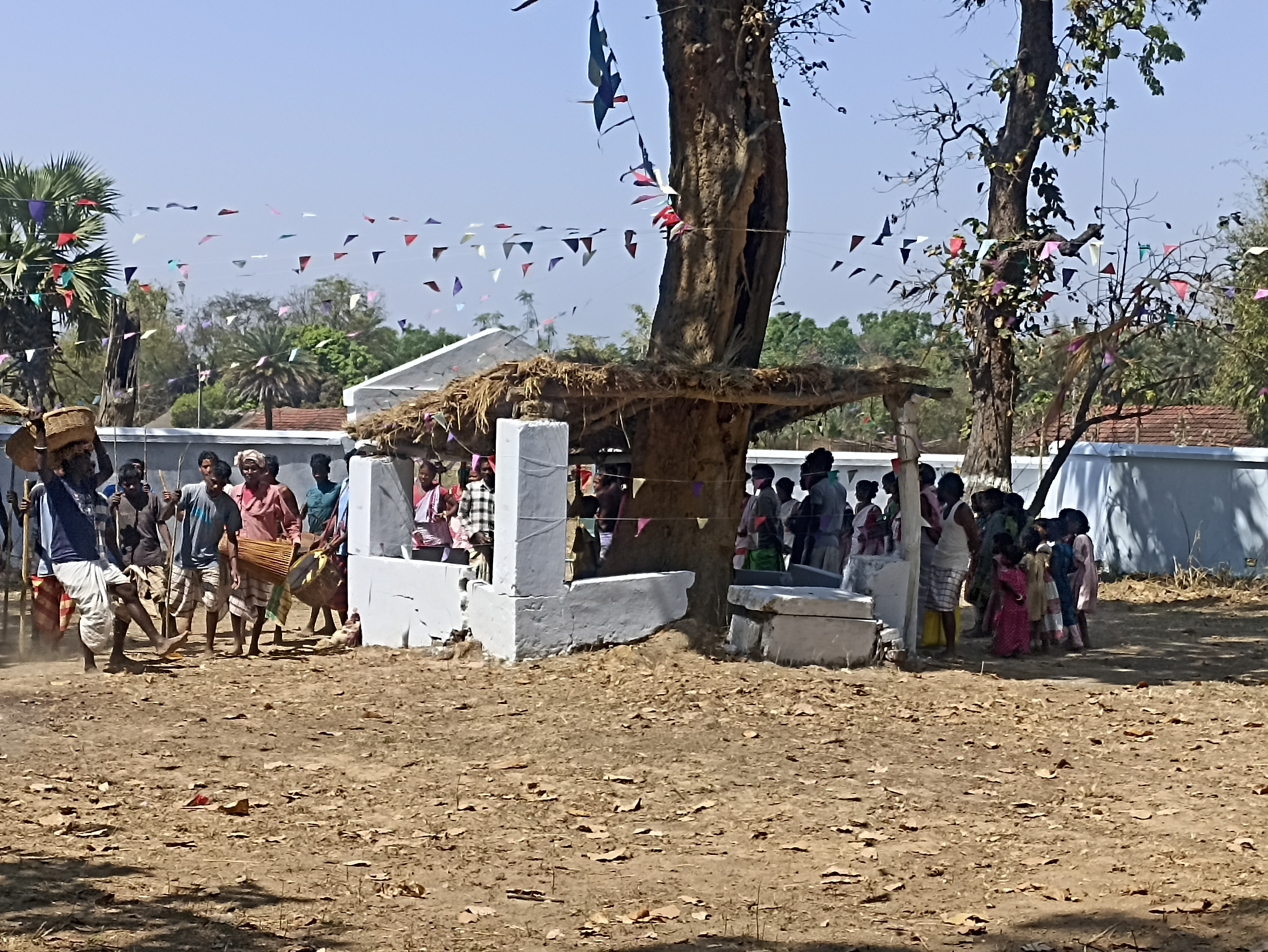
Baha Festival

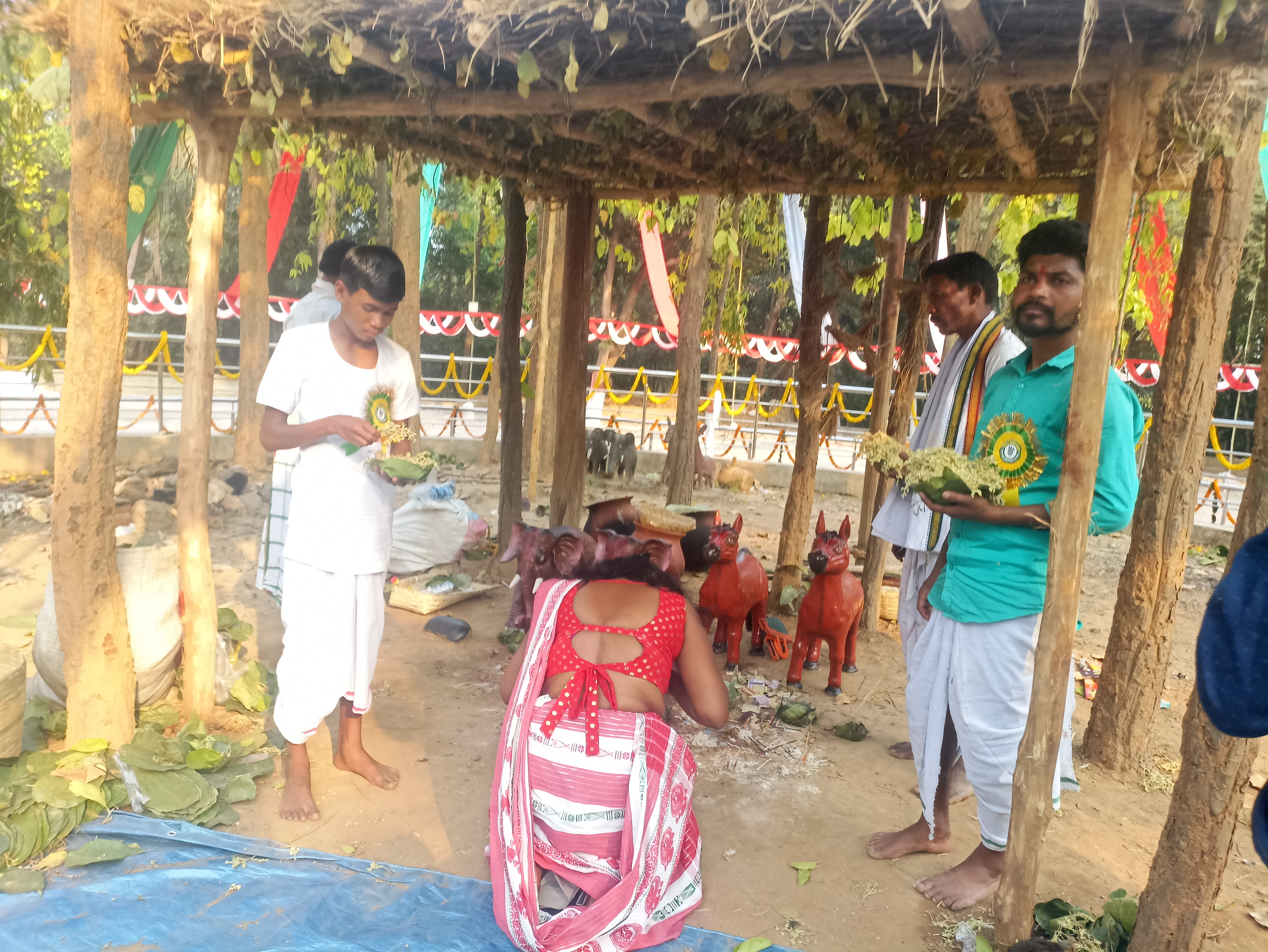
Baha Festival

A Santali folk song sung during Baha parab celebrations
