= Sari Dharam =

Indian religion

- ᱥᱟᱹᱨᱤ ᱫᱷᱚᱨᱚᱢ
- Type: Ethnic religion
- Scripture: Kherwal Bansa Dhorom Puthi; Jomsim Binti; Sari Dharam Sereng Puthi
- Supreme deity: Marang Buru
- Divine figures: Jaher Ayo; Moreko Turuiko; sawtenko
- Region: India
- Language: Santali
- Members: 506,369

Sari Dharam (Santali: ᱥᱟᱹᱨᱤ ᱫᱷᱚᱨᱚᱢ) is the religion of the Santal people residing in India. It is one of the religious beliefs in the eastern regions of Indian states such as Jharkhand, West Bengal, Bihar, Odisha, and Assam. However, Santals also practice Sarnaism. The Jomsim Binti is considered as a sacred book.

== Demographics ==
Historical population
Year	Pop.	±%
1961	35,926	—
1971	161,942	+350.8%
1981	221,991	+37.1%
1991	380,007	+71.2%
2001	638,266	+68.0%
2011	506,369	−20.7%
Source: Census of India

Distribution of Sari Dharam, 1961 census

According to the 2011 census of India, there are 506,369 followers of Sari Dharam in India, primarily from the Santal tribe of West Bengal, who make up 94.43% of the total Sari Dharam adherents.

== Scriptures ==
- Kherwal Bansa Dhorom Puthi written by Majhi Ramdas Tudu consists of the practices for worshiping by Sari Hor Hopon.
- Jomsim Binti is another notable scripture which reveals the appraisal of the supreme deity Marang Buru, Jaher Ayo, Moreko Turuiko and sawtenko.
- Sari Dharam Sereng Puthi, a collection of Holy Hymn in Santali compiled by Sadhu Ramchand Murmu is stored in several Indian universities like Vidyasagar University, West Bengal and abroad.
- Marang Buru Sari Dharam and Sari Dharam Sereng Puthi
- Sari Dharam Sarila by Nayke Mangal Chandra Soren.
- Jomsimbinti: Saridharam Scripture of Santal Race] by Somai Kisku
- Jomsim Binti Itikatha, Saridharam Dharmagrantha Jomsimbinti, by somai kisku

=== Religious Leaders ===
Earlier days, Pandit Raghunath Murmu has been known to unite Santal people through high Hital a scripture of evolution of the Earth and human being of Kherwals myth. The most notable recent preachers and religious leaders are Somai Kisku, also known as Sari Dharam Guru Baba, and Dr Subodh Hansda from West Bengal, in Eastern India.

== Demand for recognition ==
The followers demanded recognition of the Sari Dharam in West Bengal.

ASECA WB (Adibasi Socio-Educational & Cultural Association, West Bengal) is one of the main driving forces behind the ongoing social and legal movement in India demanding separate constitutional recognition for the Sari Dharam, the religious code of the Santals. ASECA WB is vigorously campaigning for a separate code for Sari Dharam in the Census and the formation of a Santali Education Board. ASECA WB is working to preserve the language and education of the Santal community, along with their fundamental Sari Dharam.

Bharat Jakat Majhi Pargana Mahal: Santal community These traditional social organizations are also vocal in demanding protection of the purity of Sari Dharam religion and government recognition at the local level. Various Santal social organizations in India like Adivasi Socio-Educational and Cultural Association, West Bengal (ASECA WB), Bharat Jakat Majhi Pargana Mahal BJMPM, Bharat Jakat Santarh Pathua Gaunta BJSPG, AISWA, Bharat Jakat Sari Dharam Baisi etc. have come together to form an alliance organization, the All India Saridharam Code Committee, for a separate religious code column for Saridharam.

Under the pressure of this continuous movement, the West Bengal Legislative Assembly passed a resolution on 17 February 2023, to recognize Sari Dharam and Sarna Dharma as separate religions and sent it to the Center.

== Organisations ==
- All India Saridharam code committee (AISCC)
- Adivasi Socio-Educational and Cultural Association (ASECA)
- All India Santal Welfare association (AISWA)
- Bharat Jakat Majhi Pargana Mahal (BJMPM)
- Bharat Jakat Santarh Pathua Gaunta (BJSPG )
- Bharat Jakat Sari Dharam Baisi (BJSDB)

== See also ==
- Tribal religions in India
- Sacred groves
