= Santal people =

Ethnic group of India, Nepal and Bangladesh

Santal
ᱥᱟᱱᱛᱟᱲ ᱦᱚᱲ
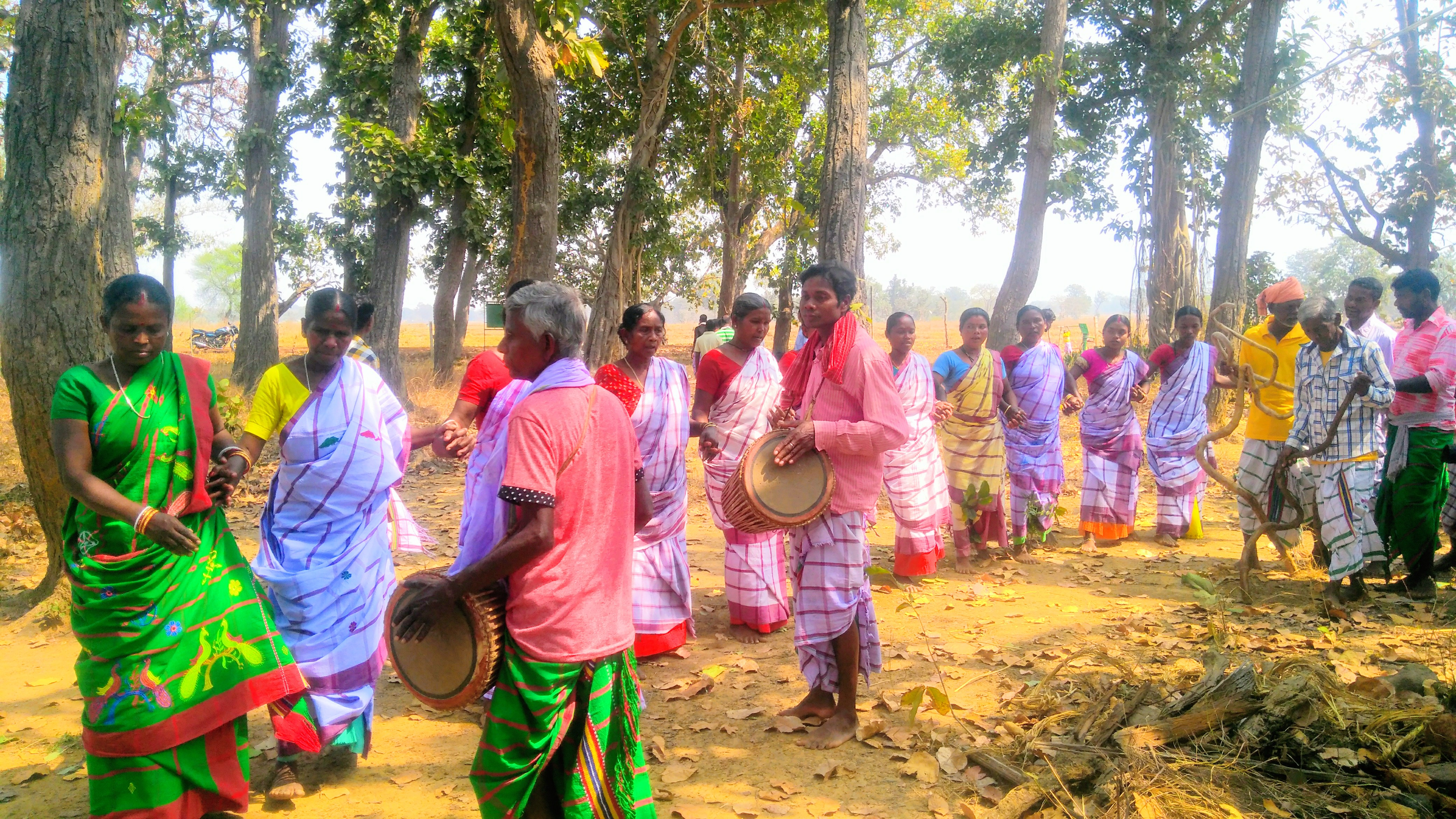
- Santals in traditional dress celebrating Baha parab

Total population
- c. 7.5 million (2011)

Regions with significant populations
- India • Bangladesh • Nepal
- India: Jharkhand: 2,754,723
- West Bengal: 2,512,331
- Odisha: 894,764
- Bihar: 406,076
- Assam: 213,139
- Tripura: 2,913
- Bangladesh: 129,049 (2021)
- Nepal: 51,735

Languages
- Santali

Religion
- Per Indian census 2011; Majority; Hinduism; Minority; Folk religions (Sari Dharam, Sarna Dharam); Islam; Christianity, Buddhism, Others

Related ethnic groups
- Mundas • Hos • Juangs • Kharias • Savaras • Korkus • Bhumijs

ᱥᱟᱱᱛᱟᱲ Santal
- Person: Santal
- People: ᱥᱟᱱᱛᱟᱲ ᱦᱚᱲ
- Language: Santali
- Country: India, Bangladesh and Nepal

The Santal (or Santhal) are an Austroasiatic-speaking Munda ethnic group of the Indian subcontinent. They constitute the largest tribal community in the Indian states of Jharkhand and West Bengal, and are also present in Odisha, Bihar, Assam, and Tripura. They are the largest ethnic minority in northern Bangladesh's Rajshahi Division and Rangpur Division. They have a sizeable population in Nepal. The Santals speak Santali, the most widely spoken language of the Munda subfamily of Austroasiatic languages.

== Etymology ==
Santal is most likely derived from an exonym. The term refers to inhabitants of Saont in erstwhile Silda in Midnapore region in West Bengal. The Sanskrit word Samant or Bengali Saont means 'plain land'. Their ethnonym is Hor Hopon ("child of human"). In other version, origin of the name Santal is thought to be the Sanskrit word 'Samanta Pal' (border protector) which became the word 'Samanta Al' in the Middle Ages. A part of ancient Midnapore was called Sawanta or Samantabhumi. Over time, the modern word Santal came into use from Samanta Pal > Sawanta Al > Sawantal.

== History ==
=== Origins ===
According to linguist Paul Sidwell, Austro-Asiatic language speakers probably arrived on the coast of Odisha from Indochina about 4,000–3,500 years ago (c. 2000 – c. 1500 BCE). The Austroasiatic speakers spread from Southeast Asia and mixed extensively with local Indian populations.

Due to the lack of significant archaeological records, the original homeland of the Santhals is not known with certainty. The folklore of the Santhals claims they came from Hihiri, which scholars have identified as Ahuri in Hazaribagh district. From there, they claim, they were pushed onto Chhota Nagpur Plateau, then to Jhalda, Patkum and finally Saont, where they settled for good. According to Dalton, where they were renamed to Santal from cluster name Kharwar. This legend, which has been cited by several scholars, has been used as evidence that the Santals once had a significant presence in Hazaribagh. Colonial scholar Colonel Dalton claimed in Chai there was a fort formerly occupied by a Santal raja who was forced to flee when the Delhi Sultanate invaded the territory.

=== British Era ===
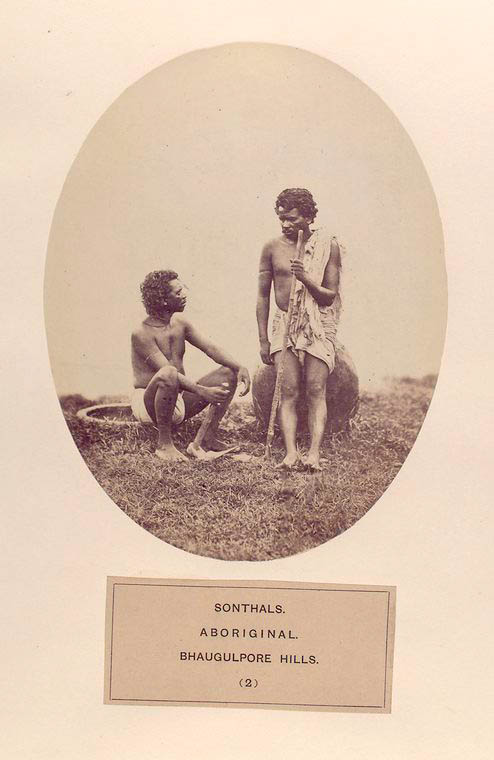
Santhals in British India, 1868

In the latter half of the 18th century, the Santals entered the historical record in 1795 when they are recorded as "Soontars". During the Bengal Famine of 1770, the drier western and southwestern parts of Bengal, especially the Jungle Mahals region, were some of the worst-hit areas and were significantly depopulated. This depopulation resulted in a significant loss of revenue for the East India Company. Therefore, when the Permanent Settlement was enacted in 1790, the Company looked for agriculturalists to clear the lands. British officials turned their attention to Santals, who were ready to clear the forest for the practice of settled agriculture. In 1832, a large number of area of the Raj Mahal hills demarcated as Damin-i-koh. Santal from Cuttack, Dhalbhum, Birbhum, Manbhum, Hazaribagh migrated and started cultivating these lands as peasants sponsored by landowners and the British who were desperate for labour. Under British direction, Santals took loans from non-Santal moneylenders to buy iron tools, seed grain and oxen as individuals and families, rather than groups as was their custom for working the land.

When they arrived in Damin-i-koh (present day Santal Pargana), the British provided no protection for the Santals against the preexisting Mal Paharias, who were against destruction of forest, were known raiders of the plains areas and had only recently been partially "pacified". Eventually, the Santals, with their better technology and ability to match the Paharia's guerrilla attacks, managed to drive them out. They clear the forest tracts and started cultivation in these areas. Their settlement took place between the 1830s and 1850s: in 1830, the area was home to only 3,000 Santals, but by the 1850s, 83,000 Santals had settled in the land and had turned it into paddy fields. This resulted in a 22 times increase in Company revenue from the area.

However, as they became more agricultural, the Santals were exploited by the zamindars. Unlike the Santals, the British valued individual competition instead of cooperation, and had a rigid system of laws very different from the relatively relaxed norms of the village council, the highest form of government most Santals knew. Mahajans from Bengal and Baniyas from Bihar began selling goods from elsewhere, and many Santals, seeing them as exotic, were tricked into debt to buy them, usually with a mortgage on their land. When the Santals were unable to pay the moneylenders back, they became owners of the land and the Santals became dispossessed landless peasants. The Baniya merchants and other outsiders also began to treat Santals as outcastes in a Brahminical system.

Eventually, these acts of exploitation, combined with British tax policies and corrupt tax collectors, deteriorated to the point where Santals grew discontented. In 1855, they revolted in the Santal rebellion, better known as the Santal Hul. 30,000 Santals, led by Sidhu and Kanhu Murmu, attacked the zamindars and other outsiders (dikkus) who had made their lives so miserable, as well as the British authorities. Eventually, around 10,000 British troops managed to suppress the rebellion. Although the rebellion's impact was largely overshadowed by that of the Indian Rebellion of 1857, the impact of the Santhal Rebellion lives on as a turning point in Santhal pride and identity. This was reaffirmed, over a century and a half later with the creation of the tribal province in the Republic of India, Jharkhand. Following the rebellion, the British satisfied all Santhal demands, due to their importance as a tax-paying group. The British created a 5000 km^{2} area, called Santal Parganas, where the normal procedures of British India did not apply. Administration of the community was primarily made the responsibility of the village headman, or pradhan, who was also given the power to collect taxes. It was made illegal for Santals to transfer land to non-Santals, allowing them to have legal rights over their land.

After the British Crown formally took control over India in 1858, the Santals continued their system of government and traditions. Newly established Christian missions brought education, and many Santals moved to the tea plantations in Assam, North Bengal, where they still remain today. However, most continued with their old life, but were still not prosperous. In addition, secular education did not become widespread until after Indian independence.

In the late 19th century, many Santals migrated from the Santal Parganas to the districts of Bihar and North Bengal such as Purnia, Malda and Dinajpur. The Santals still faced retaliation after the Santal Hul and were invited by zamindars to cultivate many parts of north Bengal, which had become scrubland, land which the Santals specialised in farming. By the 1930s, their numbers in this region the Santals had become two lakh. Most were settled on wasteland where the rent was cheaper than the more fertile wet lands. However they faced heavy taxation from the zamindars, and were oppressed by moneylenders, upper castes, and the bureaucracy in general. In 1924, several Santal sardars, influenced by Gandhian ideology and led by Jitu Sardar, began to lead agitations against the oppressive double system of elite Bengalis and British government. Santals stopped paying rent to the zamindars, beat up revenue inspectors, and led agitations against the moneylenders. In 1928, the Santals stopped paying the chaukidari tax and led protests in Thakurgaon in 1929. In 1932, several Santals attempted to organise their own state with Jitu Sardar as head, initially based on Gandhi's Ram Rajya but quickly criticised Gandhi when he did not help them. In 1933, a British commissioner was appointed to look into the grievances of Santals of North Bengal.

=== Post-independence ===
The Santal community, like the others of the region, was split between West Bengal in India and East Bengal in Pakistan during Partition. After independence, the Santals were made one of the Scheduled Tribes in India. In East Pakistan, there were some regions in the west where Santals were still in significant numbers. There and in neighbouring West Bengal, the Santals provided significant support to the Tebhaga movement. After the Pakistani military crushed the uprising and burned many Santal homes, many fled across the border to Malda in India.

In northern West Bengal, tribal peasants participated in Naxalbari uprising led by a Santal communist leader Jangal Santhal. The impoverishment has led to the Guevarist inspired Naxalite insurgency in what is often termed as the Red Corridor.

After Jharkhand was carved out of Bihar in 2000, the Santal Parganas was made a separate division of the state. These Santals have also agitated for recognition of their traditions in the census as a separate religion, sarna dharam, for which Jharkhand assembly passed a resolution in 2020. Many still face poverty and exploitation, and in Bangladesh, theft of their lands is common. Although spread out over a large area, they now consider the Santal Parganas as their cultural heartland.

== Society ==
The base of Santal society is a division between "sibling" (boeha) and "guest" (pera), a divide found in many other tribal societies of central and eastern India. Children of the same father (sometimes grandfather), known as nije boeha, often live next to each other and own adjacent pieces of land. Those in the closest form of brotherhood, called mit orak hor ("people of one house") in Singhbhum, cannot marry each other and propitiate the same deity, since the house refers to a common ancestor from which all the families are believed to descend. Only mit orak hor marriages are severely stigmatised. Another brotherhood is membership of a clan, which are exogamous. The last form of brotherhood is phul, a ritual friendship with members of other ethnic groups. Children of phul brothers consider themselves as brothers, and they attend each other's main lifecycle events, such as weddings or funerals, as pera. They also give help in times of hardship. (Note: Schulte-Droesch 2018, pp. 99–100)

Those who do not have brotherhood are referred to as pera, or guests. Members of other communities, especially those not speaking Santali, are excluded from this grouping, except for communities such as the Karmakar, Mahali or Lohar of their locality, who are enmeshed in Santal society. Those with this relationship can marry, and attend major festivals as guests. People related by marriage, although pera, have special roles in life-cycle events. Women perform special welcome rituals for pera when they visit. Those related by marriage can have one of two relationships. They can be bala, a relationship exemplified by the couple's parents, or sangat, between cross-siblings of a couple. (Note: Schulte-Droesch 2018, p. 100)

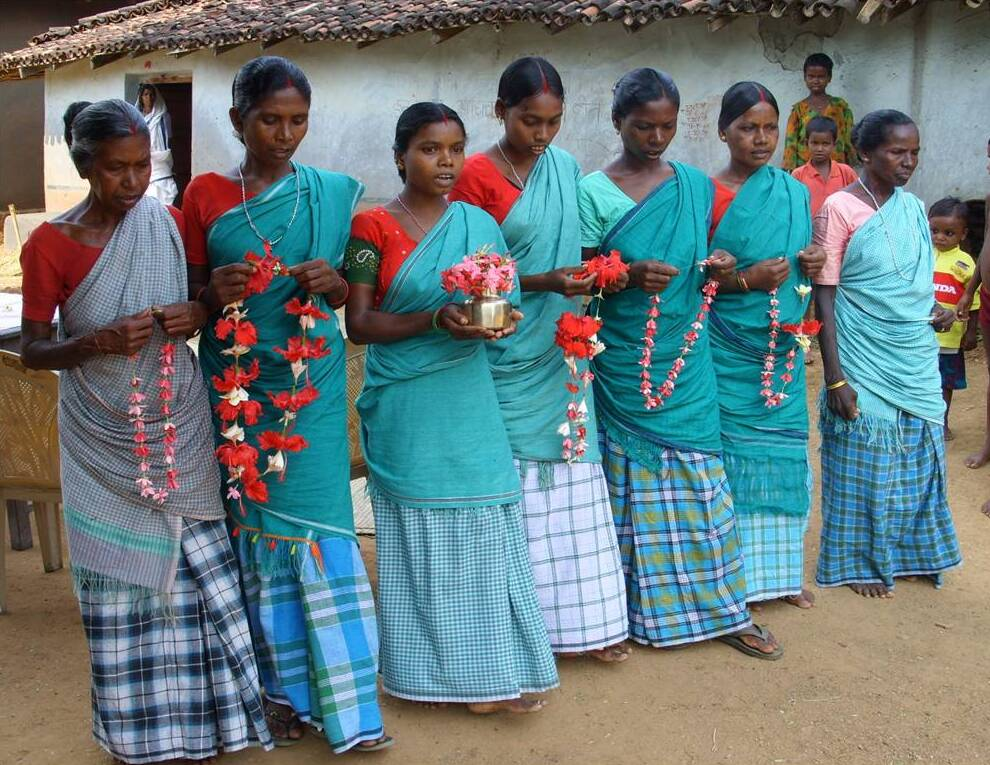
Santal women

Santal society has much less stratification and is more egalitarian than adjacent Caste-defined Hindu society, but still has some status differences. The most important marker of a person when interacting with others in Santal society is their standing as marang ("senior") or hudin ("junior"). This standing is evaluated by relation: for example, if someone is greeting their father's elder brother's son, they would be the junior irrespective of age. Similarly, when someone greets their elder brother's wife, the wife would be marang. However, for strangers or guests with no clear kin connections, the question of marang or hudin is decided by age. (Note: Schulte-Droesch 2018, p. 102) The ritual greeting (god in Santali) of someone is given much importance and is done in the courtyard of a house when a pera visits. The greeting differs by gender, and whether the person is junior or senior to the one being greeted. The greeting rituals given by a hudin involve an "offering" (dobok' johar) of respect, while a marang "receives" this respect. This greeting should not be done hastily, and correct practice of it is encouraged in children from a young age. (Note: Schulte-Droesch 2018, p. 103) However the hudin-marang distinction does not apply to phul or bala, who instead greet each other as if greeting a marang. (Note: Schulte-Droesch 2018, p. 104)

The Santals also have totemistic clans, known as pari. These 12 clans are divided into two ranks: 7 senior and 5 junior. The senior clans are believed to originate from the 7 sons and daughters of the first man and woman, and in order of seniority they are: Hansda (goose), Murmu (Nilgai), Marandi (Ischaemum rugosum), Kisku (kingfisher), Soren (Pleiades), Hembram (betel palm) and Tudu (owl). (Note: Schulte-Droesch 2018, p. 109) The junior clans are Baskey or Baske (stale rice), Besra (falcon), Chorey or Chonre (lizard), Pauria or Pawria (pigeon) and Bediya. Members of a senior clan do not marry members of a junior clan, and there are some forbidden marriages as well, such as between Marandi and Kisku. In addition, Besras are sometimes treated differently due to their perceived low status, but other than the context of marriage, they play no role in social life. The clans also avoid harming their clan totem, lest evil befall them. (Note: Schulte-Droesch 2018, pp. 110–111)

The Santals have another social organisation important for rituals, called khunti, or gusti in south Chota Nagpur. (Note: The term comes from the Bengali goshti, meaning clans. It seems likely that the nearby Santals of Singhbhum borrowed the word.) The term refers to descendants of a common ancestor, no more than a few generations back, that live nearby. The khunti is identified by some distinguishing feature of the ancestor, such as poeta, people who wear a thread on their chest in worship. In many cases, all the people of a gusti live in their ancestral village, but some members may have migrated to neighbouring villages. (Note: Schulte-Droesch 2018, p. 117)

== Culture ==
=== Festivals ===
Sohrai is the principal festival of the Santal community. Other important festivals include Baha, Karam, Dashain, Sakrat, Mahmore, Rundo and Magsim. They traditionally accompany many of their dances during these festivals with two drums: the Tamak‘ and the Tumdak’.

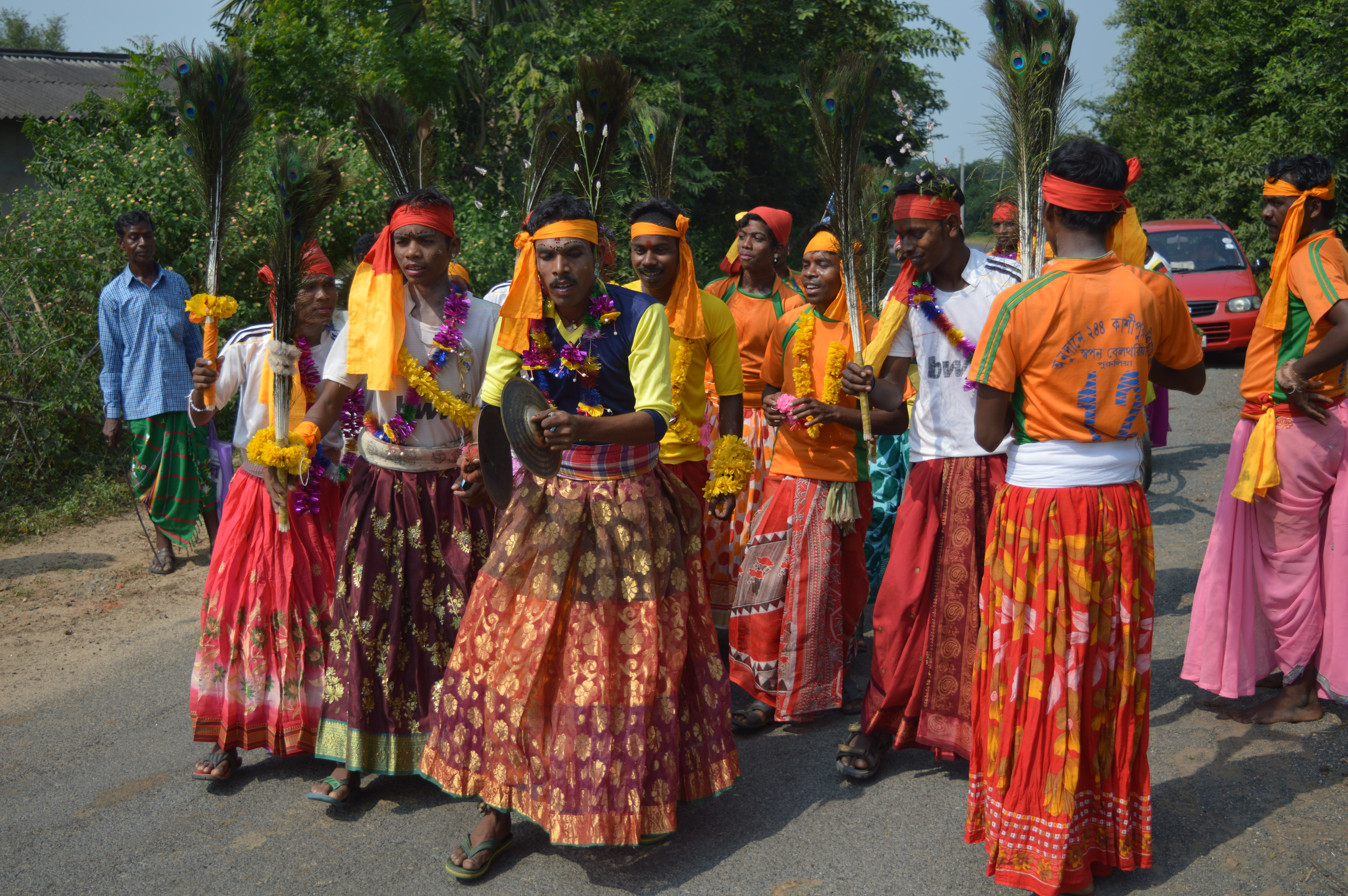
A traditional Dasai dance in Purulia district, West Bengal

A tradional Sohrai Song, sung by Paulina Mardi, Donyson Mardi and Pushtina Mardi.

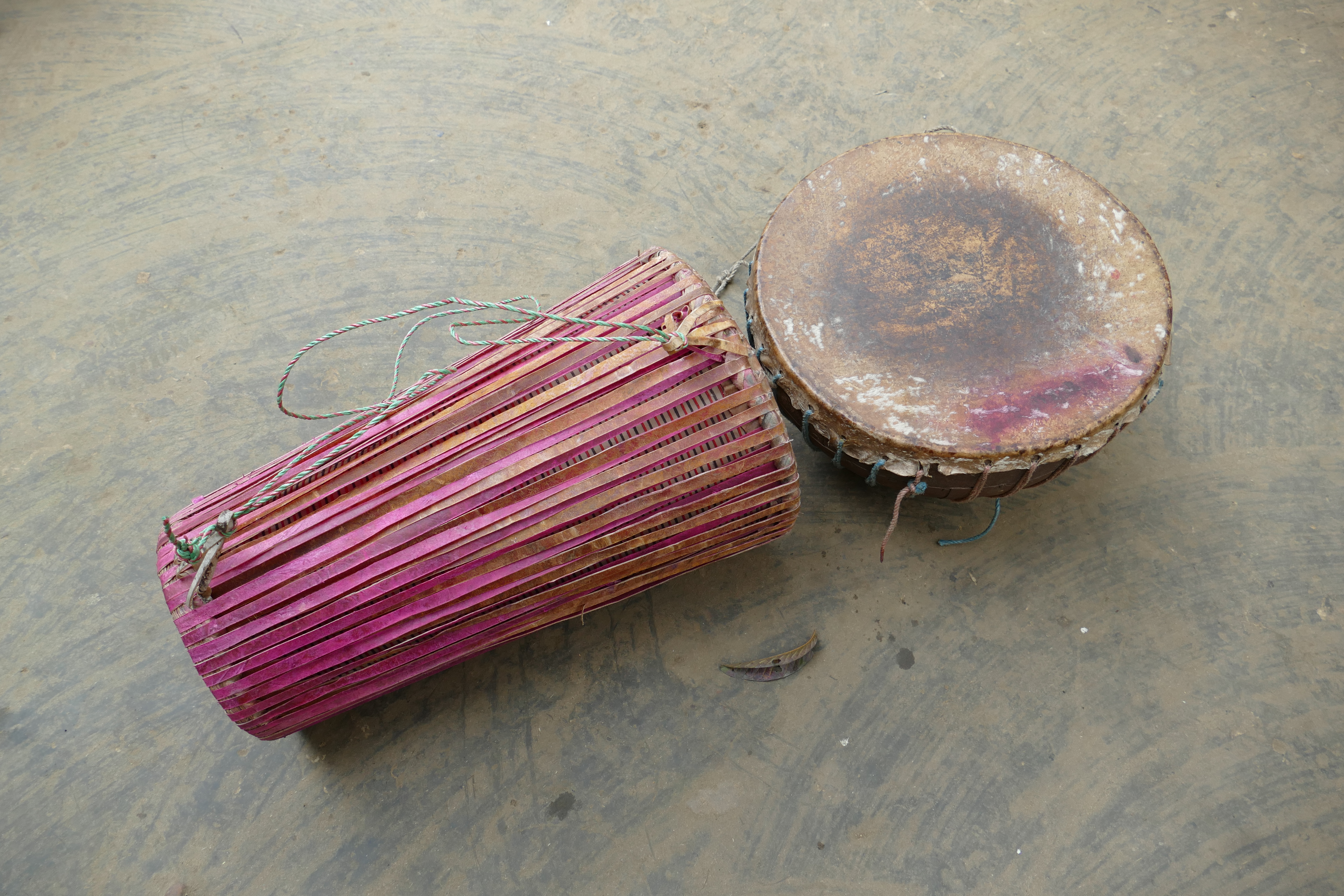
Tamak (r.) and Tumdak (l.) - typical drums of the Santhal people, photographed in a village in Dinajpur district, Bangladesh.

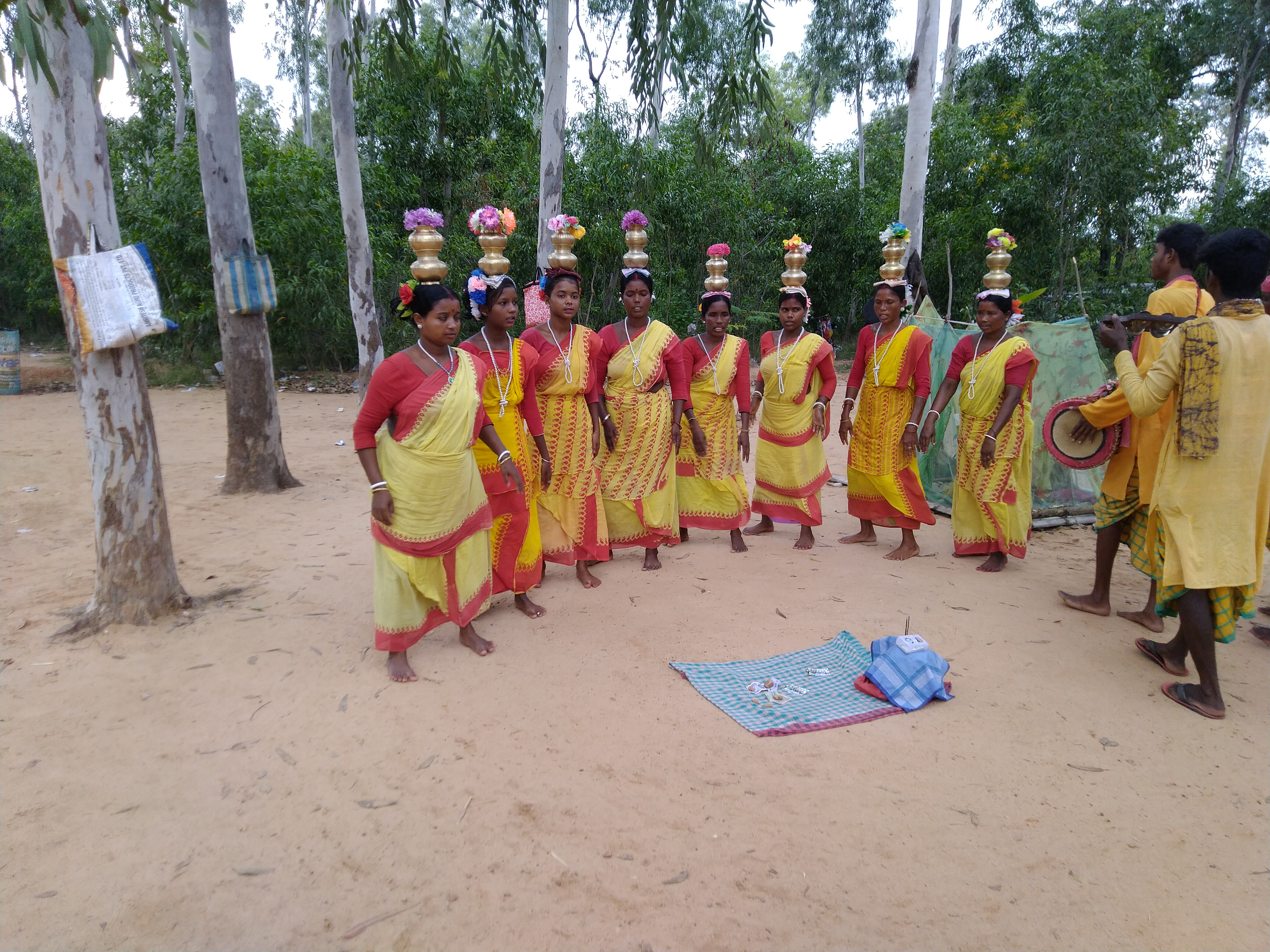
Lungi Panchi Dance of Santal in Birbhum, West Bengal

Chadar Badar, a form of puppetry known also as Santal puppetry, is a folk show involving wooden puppets placed in a small cage which acts as the stage.

Local affairs are handled by a village council, led by a manjhi.

The walls of traditional Santal homes are ornamented with carved designs of animals, hunting scenes, dancing scenes, and geometric patterns. Santal bridal palanquins are also finely carved.

=== Marriage ===
Santal house at 2020 Odisha Tribal fair, Bhubaneswar

There are seven kinds of marriage recognised in the Santal community, each with its own degree of social acceptance. The most elaborate kind of marriage is the hapramko bapla, or ancestor's marriage, but the most widely practised is kesimek'. In this form of marriage, a boy and girl who wish to marry decide to go to the groom's house and stay there a while. When the girl's family are made aware of their situation, the jog majhi of the girl's village arrives at the house of the headman of the boy's village to discover the couple's intentions. The couple are summoned to the village headman and the bride is asked whether she wishes to set a date for kesimek'. If she replies 'no', the boy's family will have to pay a small fine to the jog majhi of the girl's village, who would take the girl back to her father. If she assents, the boy's family is consulted for the best day for the kesimek'. The bride and groom are not bound by any obligation to marry. During this time, the jog majhi stays in the village to give all the information he can to the bride's father: both in determining what would be a good bride price to demand and whether the marriage might end in a short time.

On the day of the kesimek' ceremony, a group of men from the bride's village, including the jog majhi, headman, village elders, and the bride's father and some relations, arrives at the bride's village. They are seated at the headman's house with respect and organised by marang or hudin status. Meanwhile, the groom's family gathers to discuss the bride price the groom's father should pay. The two parties then meet and the fathers negotiate the bride price to be paid. The groom is first asked whether he wishes the marriage to continue. As a symbolic marriage contract, the groom's father gives a small amount of cash and gives handi (rice-beer) to the guests. The negotiations for bride-price continue between the fathers exclusively until an amount is reached. Although this is nowadays in cash, livestock or other goods are not uncommon. The bride price is generally light and it is seen wrong to stop two young people from marrying because of a disagreement about bride price. After an agreement is reached, celebrations ensue and festive drinking continues into the night.

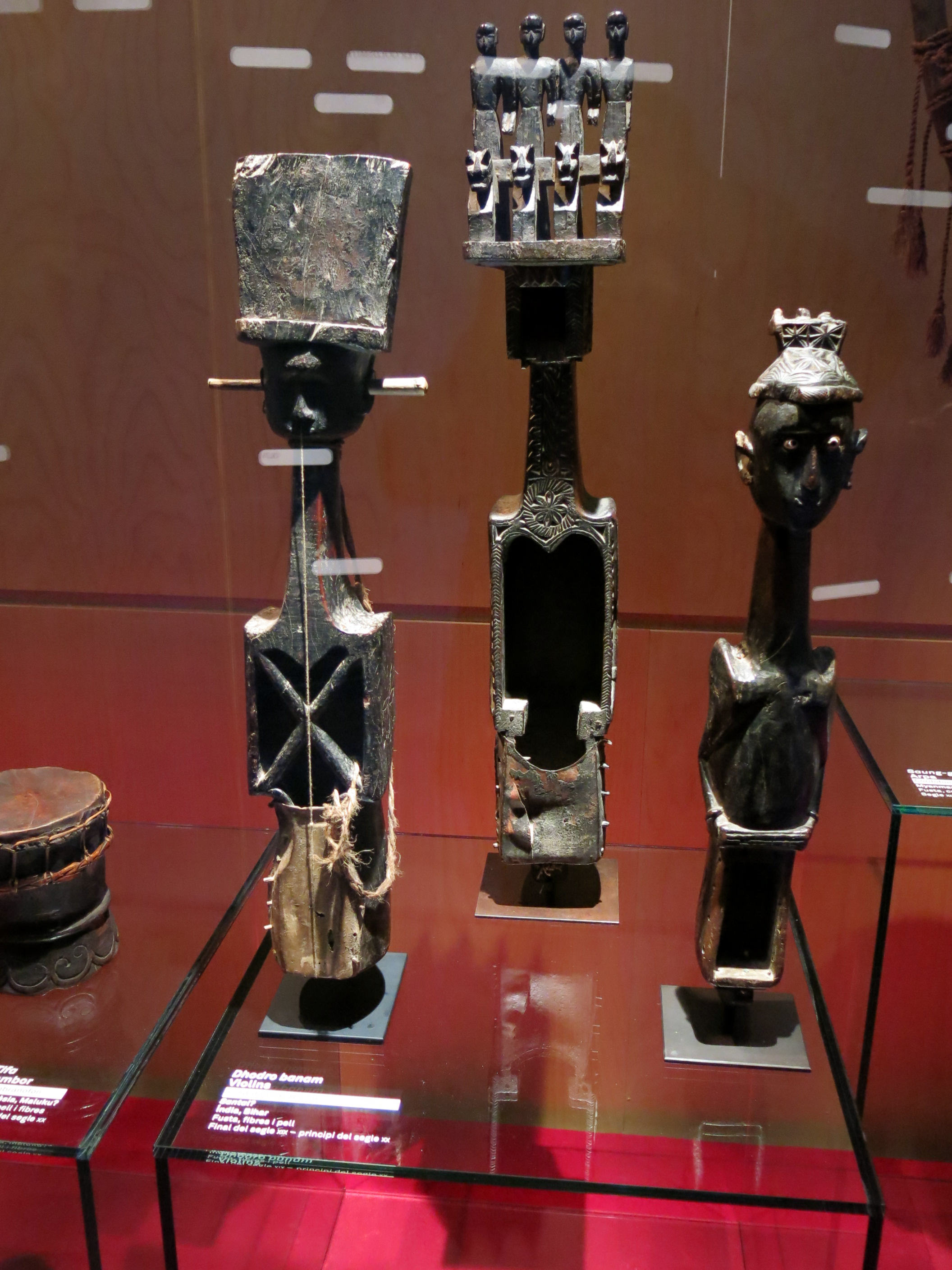
Dhodro banam musical instruments

A short time afterwards, a relative of the groom along with the jog majhi of the groom's village hand over the bride price to the bride's family. Afterwards the couple arrive in the bride's natal village. The bride arriving first carrying a pot with white clay, the symbol of a woman returning to her natal village as a guest. The bride greets her mother first and neighbours are invited to share handi reserved for pera (pera hor handi), while getting acquainted with the husband. When the couple leaves the bride's village, the bride pays her respects to the headman in his courtyard. At the Majhi Than, the bride thanks the headman for all he has done and gives a symbolic gift. The headman then blesses the couple and wishes the bride strength, good luck and many strong sons. The couple then leaves for the groom's village to start their new life.

A Santali bapla (wedding) song

Marriages done by kesimek' involve very little ritual: Santal society has clearly defined roles for marriage, and the choice of the couple is respected. Decisions by the families are done in a spirit of consensus rather than adversarially, and marriage is seen just as important for the entire village as for the couple.

Northern Santali Dong song by Simoti Mardi

== Religion ==
Religion among Santal people of Bihar, West Bengal, Jharkhand, Odisha and Tripura
1. Hinduism (63.1%)
2. Sarnaism (23.0%)
3. Sari Dharam (7.28%)
4. Christianity (5.45%)
5. Other (1.12%)

The Santal are granted Scheduled Tribe status in five states: Bihar, West Bengal, Jharkhand, Odisha, and Tripura, where they account for a total population of 6,570,807 according to the 2011 Census of India. Of this population, 63.15% are reported as Hindu, 23% as Sarna, 7.28% as Sari Dharam (all in West Bengal), and 5.46% as Christian. Other minor religious affiliations include Bidin (27,602), Muslim (13,014), Santal (4,771), Sumra Sandhi (2,059), Sarvdharm (1,625), Buddhist (1,121), Adi Bassi (1,100), Sikh (987), Kharwar (385), Sant (356), Saran (352), Jain (348), Achinthar (273), Sarin (185), Marangboro (167), Saranath (157), Seran (125), Adi (84), and Alchichi (78). Additionally, 102 were Atheist, 331 were believers of Tribal religion, 1,123 followed other unclassified religions, and 16,974 did not state any religious affiliation.

According to the doctrine of Sari Dharam (a religion based on truths), the Santals are broadly divided into three categories: Um-hor, followers of Christianity; Saka-hor, followers of Hinduism; and Bonga-hor, followers of Sari Dharam. While Sari Dharam is predominantly observed in West Bengal, Santals in other states commonly identify their religious practices under the framework of Sarna Dharam, an umbrella term for tribal religions. Historically, the Santals practised their autonomous religious beliefs without assigning specific nomenclature to their faith. From the beginning of census operations in India, they mobilised into various religious-political movements, identifying under names such as Santal, Adibasi, Jaher, Sohrai, Sari, and Sarna, to distinguish themselves from the prevalent religions of India, such as Hinduism and Christianity. Although, those beliefs denomination were administratively clubbed together as Animism in the colonial census. Post-independence, the census publishes macro-level de facto data, specifically for the scheduled communities; thus, there has been a tendency toward revivalism and unification of diverse religious identities among them, with many Santals aligning under the banners of Sarna Dharma, except for the Santals of West Bengal. They regarded it as having more political motives than religious ones and adhered to their own developed religion, named Sari Dharma, based on their ancestral ethics, values, and beliefs. In fact, in the 1961 census, except for Hinduism, most Santals identified their religion by their own ethnic identity, Santhal, while others identified with various beliefs, including Sari and Sarna Dharma. Later, in the 1971 census, the Santhal religion was replaced by Sarna Dharma, a religious identity that only a few Santals had identified with in previous censuses, and the shift was primarily attributed to the Jharkhand statehood movement. However, while all those terms differ in nomenclature from a religio-political perspective, in practice, they reflect a synthesis of ancestral autonomous beliefs and elements of dominant religions like Hinduism and Christianity.

In the religious beliefs of Santals, the core of reverence falls on a court of spirits (bonga), who handle different aspects of the world and who are placated with prayers and offerings. These benevolent spirits operate at the village, household, ancestor, and sub-clan level, along with evil spirits that cause disease and can inhabit village boundaries, mountains, water, tigers, and the forest. The bonga are intermediaries between noa puri (visible world) and hana puri (the invisible reality), the abode of a Creator. This creator is variously called Marang Buru (Supreme Deity or literally The Great Mountain) or Thakur Jiu (life giver), and is the "cause of all causes," making the Santal religion, in a deep sense, monotheistic as well as pantheistic.

There are several ranks of bongas: the most important are associated intimately with Marang Buru and are worshipped by all Santals. These include Marang Buru bonga, Jaher Era bonga and Gosae Era. Other bongas, who are held to be less powerful, are the spirits of important people of the village who have since been deified. There is also another class of bongas who are feared as bringers of evil. These spirits are not placated by a priest but by a medicine-man called ojha. In the present-day, belief in these malignant bongas is eroding due to the penetration of modern medical science. The lack of a separate name for malignant bongas caused many early colonial scholars to present Santal religion as wholly focused on the appeasement of evil spirits or as representing bongas as exclusively harmful. However bonga in itself simply means a supernatural force in the world and has no specific connotation with good or evil. Moreover, these bongas do not refer to specific objects but to the invisible force that governs or is associated with those objects.

The Santal creation story holds that originally the world was water, and Marang Buru and some lesser deities were the only inhabitants. When some spirits requested permission to make humans, Marang Buru asked Malan Budhi to create the human bodies. When she had finally succeeded, she was told by Marang Buru to use the human spirits that were high on the rafters of his hut. She could not reach the human spirit, and took the bird spirit instead. When Marang Buru integrated the spirits with the bodies, they flew away and asked for a place to build a nest. Marang Buru could not get anyone else to bring land to the surface, and so the tortoise volunteered and pushed the Earth onto his back. The birds then gave birth to a boy and a girl called Pilchu Haram and Pilchu Budhi. These two had seven sons and seven daughters, but the couple soon had a quarrel and separated. Pilchu Haram and his sons became great hunters, and on a time came upon the daughters, who had become maidens and were unrecognisable. They became introduced and had sex. Looking for his sons, Pilchu Haram discovered an old woman and asked for fire, and upon talking to her more, he discovered his wife and reconciled with her. Another version tells how Pilchu Budhi was in fact in tears at her daughters' disappearance, but Marang Buru reassured her that they were all safe and brought her to reconcile with her husband. When their sons found out they had married their sisters, they were very angry and would have killed their parents if Marang Buru had not hidden them in a cave, where they stayed for the rest of their days. The children of these seven couples became the progenitors of the Santal clans.

A characteristic feature of a Santal village is a sacred grove (known as Jaher) (Note: Schulte-Droesch 2018, p. 187) on the edge of the village where many spirits live and where a series of annual festivals take place. This grove is set aside in the founding of the village and left undisturbed except at times of festival. Inside is set a series of natural (uncut) stones which represent the bongas, but are not substitutes except during festival. The Majhi Than, a raised mound of earth covered with a thatched roof outside the headman's house, is where the Majhi's ancestors' spirits live. During the summer, a jug of water is placed there so the spirits can drink. Here the most important decisions of the village are made, including judgements.

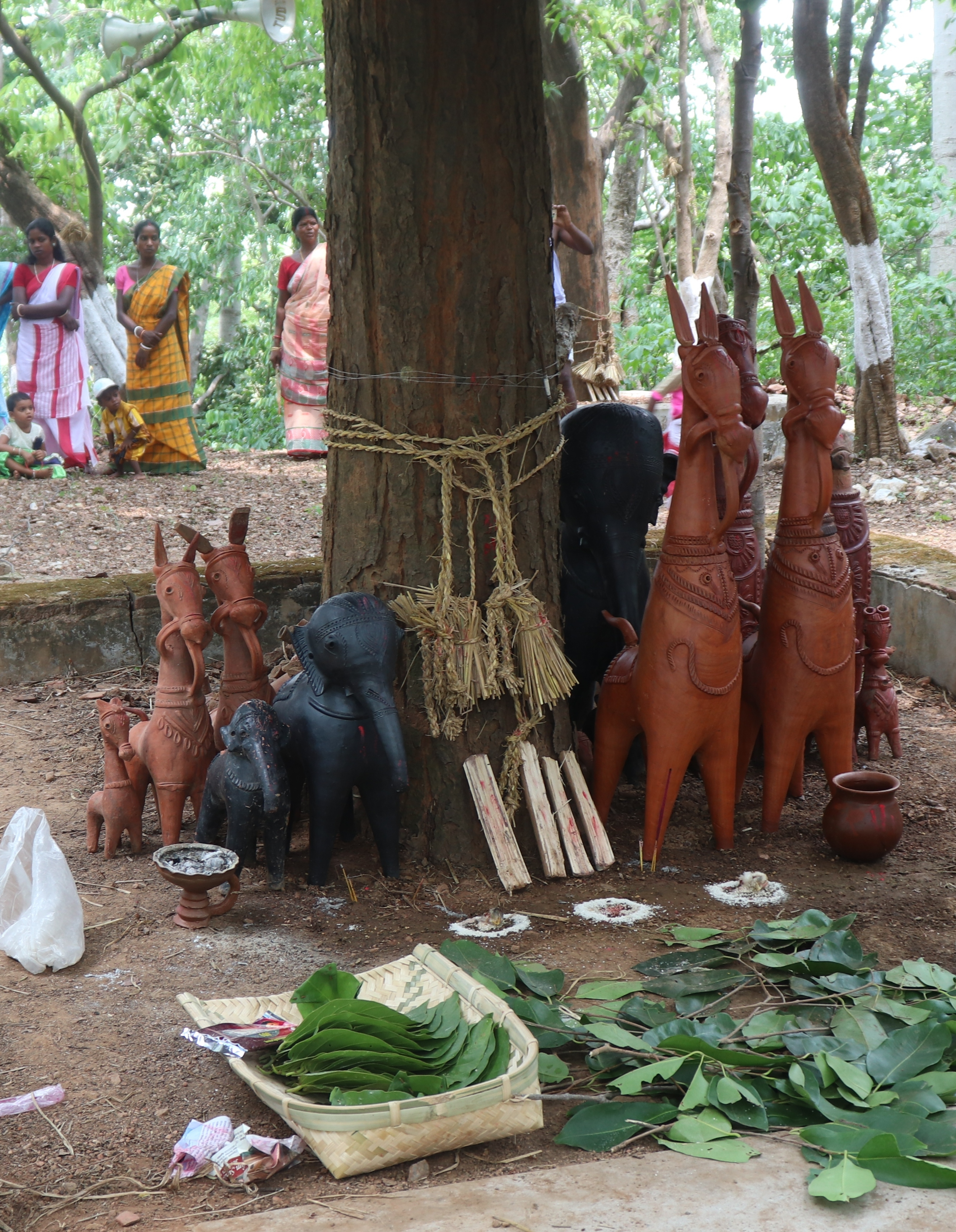
Jaher, the holy place of Santal

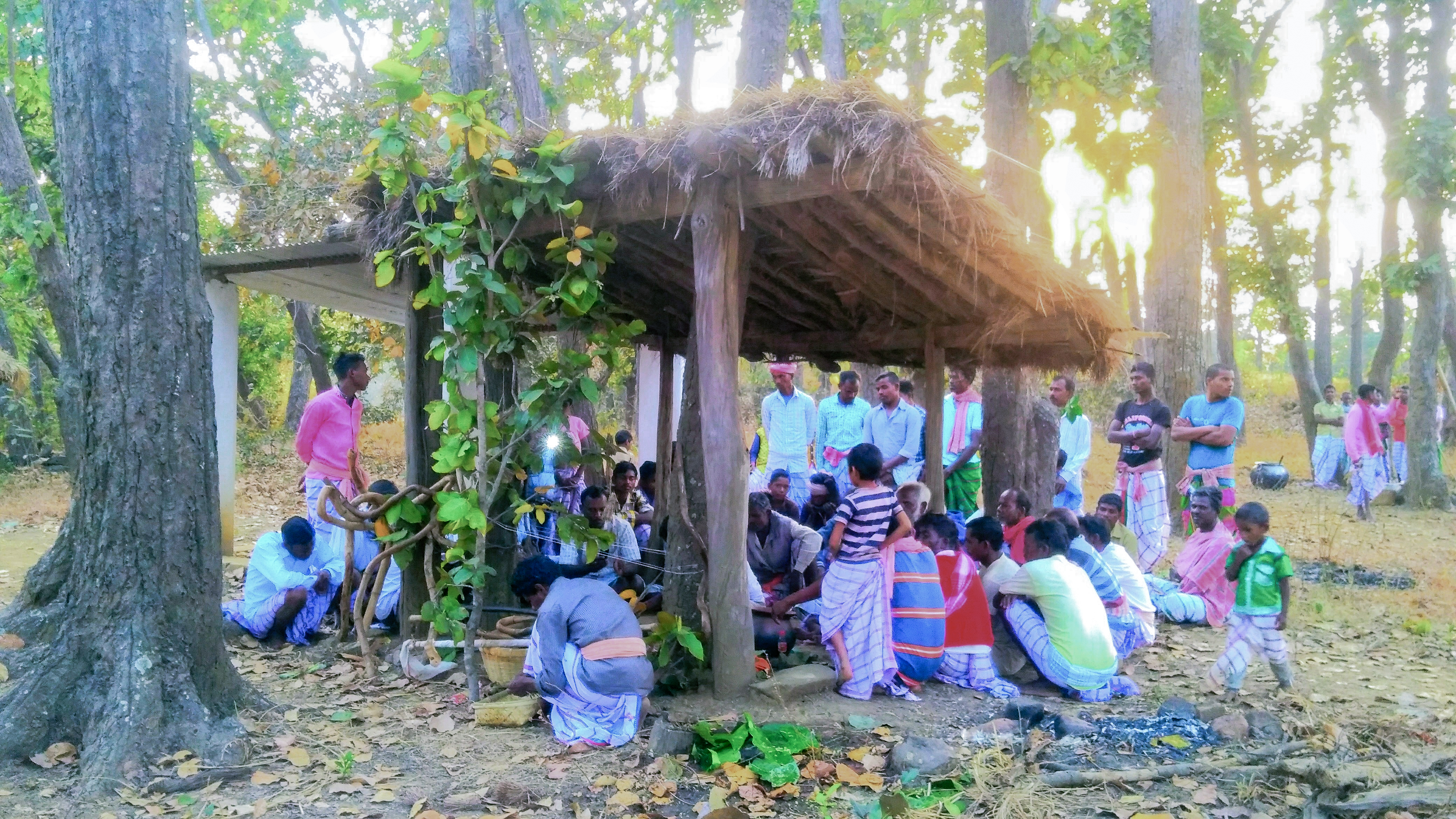
People performing rituals in Jaher, Mayurbhanj district, Odisha

A yearly round of rituals connected with the agricultural cycle, along with life-cycle rituals for birth, marriage and burial at death, involves petitions to the spirits and offerings that include the sacrifice of animals, usually birds. Religious leaders are male specialists in medical cures who practice divination and witchcraft (the socio-historic meaning of the term, used here, refers to the ritual practice of magic and is not pejorative). Similar beliefs are common among other tribes on the Chota Nagpur Plateau like the Kharia, Munda, and Oraon.

Smaller and more isolated tribes often demonstrate less articulated classification systems of the spiritual hierarchy described as animism or a generalised worship of spiritual energies connected with locations, activities, and social groups. Religious concepts are intricately entwined with ideas about nature and interaction with local ecological systems. As in Santal religion, religious specialists are drawn from the village or family and serve a wide range of spiritual functions that focus on placating potentially dangerous spirits and co-ordinating rituals.

== Politics ==
=== Schedule Tribe status ===
The Santhal people are constitutionally designated as Scheduled Tribes only in Fifth Schedule areas, such as Bihar, Jharkhand, West Bengal, Odisha, and Tripura. While the Santals, who migrated from Fifth Schedule areas to Sixth Schedule areas, specifically to Assam as tea garden labourers during the British Raj, are not considered Scheduled Tribes. Instead, they are classified as Other Backward Class in Assam, and the remaining population living in other states is considered part of the general population. The inclusion in Schedule Tribe list have been opposed by respective states and tribal activists organisation following Sixth Scheduled autonomy, such as the Coordination Committee of Tribal Organisations of Assam (CCTOA). The organisation feared up that granting Scheduled Tribe status to the Santal and other 40 migrated tribal communities will squeeze up the benefits of natives, the "original tribal people" of the state.

=== Religion status ===
The Santhal people believe in nature worship, and their place of worship is in sacred groves known as Jaher and Sarna, in contrast to Hindu places of worship in temples. They also perform animal sacrifices to honour their gods and accept flesh, including beef and pork, practices that are generally prohibited in Hinduism. Thus they consider themselves believers of Sari and Sarna religion rather than Hinduism. Although there is overlap of ideology, belief, culture and practices in between Sarnasim and Hinduism.

== Notable people ==
=== Administrative officials ===
- G. C. Murmu, 14th CAG of India and first lieutenant governor of Jammu and Kashmir

=== Entertainment ===
- Rathin Kisku, Baul singer.

=== Freedom fighters ===
- Sidhu and Kanhu Murmu, leader of Santhal rebellion.

=== Literature ===
- Turia Chand Baskey, writer
- Damayanti Beshra, writer
- Shyam Sundar Besra, writer
- Rupchand Hansda, writer
- Arjun Charan Hembram, writer
- Sarada Prasad Kisku, writer from Purulia
- Joba Murmu, writer
- Raghunath Murmu, inventor of Ol Chiki script. He is also known as Olguru.
- Sadhu Ramchand Murmu, Santali poet, known as Kabiguru.
- Hansda Sowvendra Shekhar, writer
- Kherwal Soren, writer and politician

=== Politicians ===
- Birbaha Hansda, Santali-language actress and politician, Forest Minister, Government of West Bengal
- Mohan Charan Majhi, Chief Minister of Odisha
- Babulal Marandi, first chief minister of Jharkhand
- Droupadi Murmu, 15th president of India, former governor of Jharkhand, former minister, Government of Odisha.
- Khagen Murmu, an Indian politician and a Member of Parliament from Maldaha Uttar (Lok Sabha constituency), West Bengal.
- Salkhan Murmu, Indian socio-political activist, former MP from Mayurbhanj
- Uma Saren, politician, former MP from Jhargram
- Hemant Soren, Chief Minister of Jharkhand
- Shibu Soren, former chief minister of Jharkhand and founder of Jharkhand Mukti Morcha. He is also known as Disomguru.

=== Science and technology ===
- Naresh Chandra Murmu, chief scientist and director of Central Mechanical Engineering Research Institute, Durgapur, West-Bengal, India.

=== Sports ===
- Purnima Hembram, track-and-field athlete
- Rafayel Tudu, football player
- Shanti Mardi, football player
