= Sarhul =

Spring Festival in India

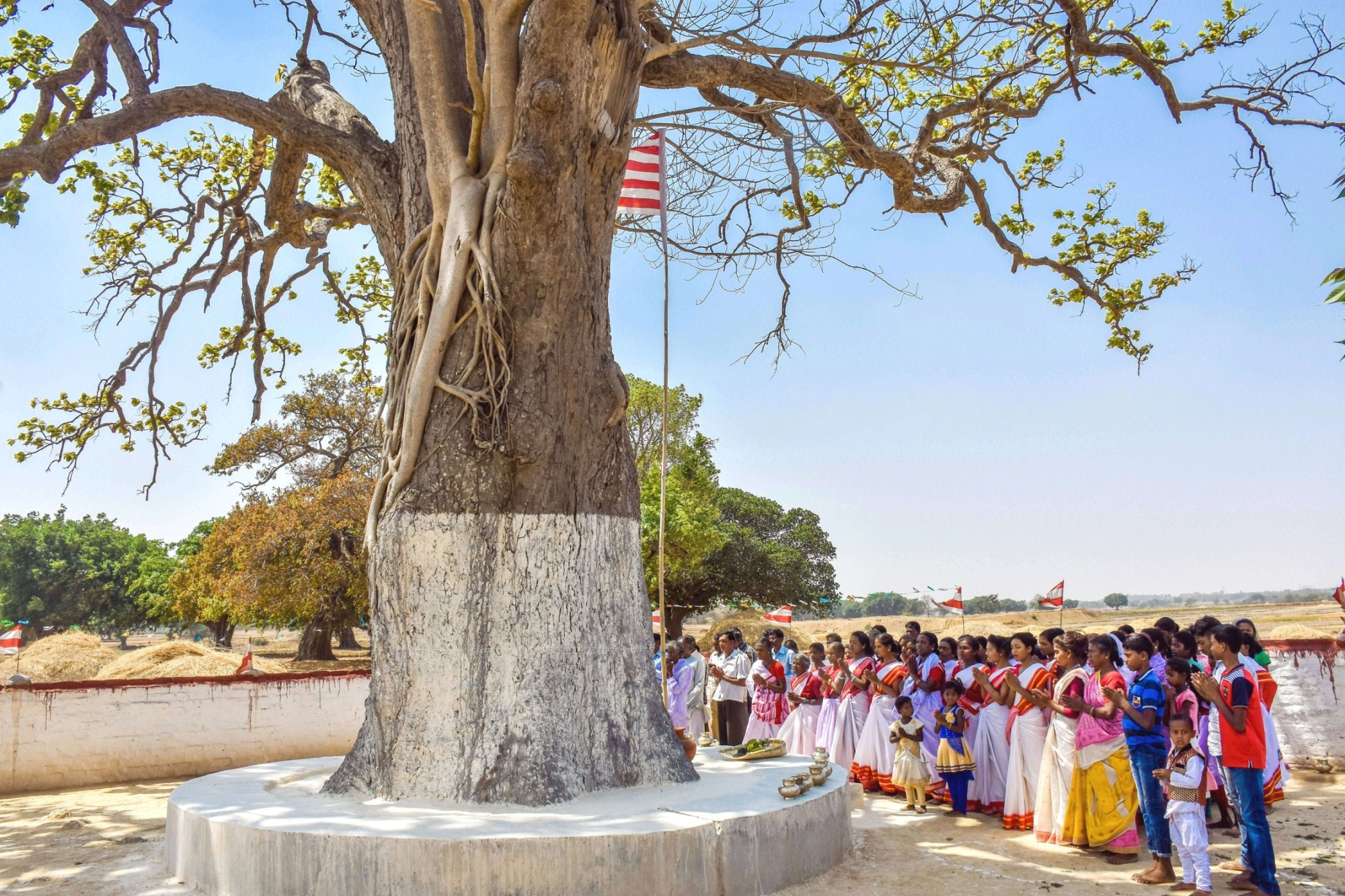
People worshiping under the sacred Sarna tree on the occasion of Sarhul in the outskirts of Ranchi, Jharkhand.

Sarhul is a spring festival celebrated in the Indian state of Jharkhand, marking the commencement of the new year. The festival lasts for three days, from the third day of the Chaitra month in Shukla Paksha to Chaitra Purnima. During the festival, the village priest, known as the Pahan offers a sacrifice of flowers, fruits, vermilion, a rooster, and tapan (liquor) in the Sarna to the Sun, the village deity, and the ancestors for the prosperity of the village. After the rituals, locals dance while holding Sal flowers.

According to tradition, Sarhul also symbolizes the marriage between the Earth and the Sun. It is an important festival observed by the Kurukh and Sadan communities. Among the Kurukh, it is known as Khaddi (meaning "flower" in the Kurukh language). The festival is called Hadi Bonga among the Bhumijs, while among the Ho and Munda people, it is known as Baa Parab. The Santals call it Baha Parab. In December 2025, Sujeet Kumar, Member of Parliament, Rajya Sabha (Upper House) advocated to nominate Sarhul to UNESCO's intangible cultural herigate list.

== Etymology ==
Different tribes have their own names for the festival. Sarhul is the Nagpuri name for the festival. In Nagpuri, Sar or Sarai refers to the Sal tree (Shorea robusta) and hul means 'collectively' or 'grove'. It symbolizes the celebration of nature through the Sal tree.

Alternative interpretations include:

- Hul may refer to 'revolution,' symbolizing a revolution through Sal flowers.
- Sar means 'year,' and Hul means 'begin', representing the beginning of a new year.

Different names of this spring festival
Festival name	Language	Tribe/Community	Location	Source
Sarhul	Nagpuri	Several tribes/communities	Jharkhand, West Bengal, Odisha, Chhattisgarh, Assam	
Baha parab, Baha Bonga	Santali	Santal	Jharkhand, Odisha, West Bengal, Assam	
Baa parab	Mundari, Ho	Munda, Ho	Jharkhand, Odisha	
Hadi Bonga	Bhumij	Bhumij	Jharkhand, West Bengal, Odisha	
Khāddi, Khakhel-benja	Kurukh	Oraon	Jharkhand	
Amnuakhia	Kharia	Kharia	Odisha, Jharkhand, West Bengal	

== Celebration ==
In this festival, people worship in Sarna. Ploughing is forbidden on this day. People observe a fast one day before the festival. Young people collect Sal flowers from the nearby forest and catch crabs and fish. On the occasion of the festival, people go to Sarna to the beats of Dhol, Nagara and Mandar. They worship the Sal tree, and Shalai, the flowers of the Sal tree, are offered to the deities.

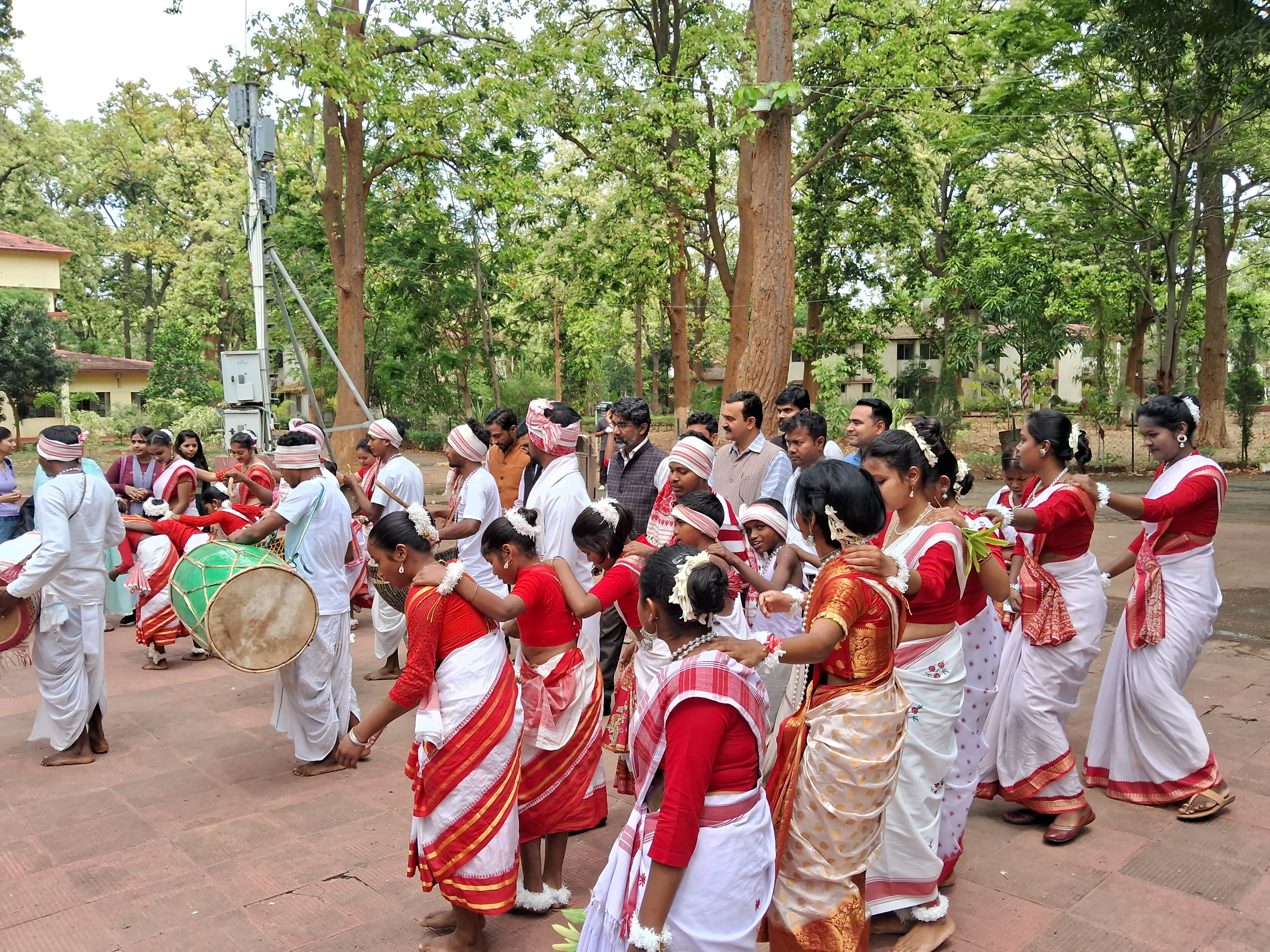
A group of women, dressed in traditional red and white sarees and attire performing traditional sarhul festival folk dance

The village priest, Pahan (sometimes called Laya or Deuri) and Pujar, offers sacrifices to the village deity, including Sal flowers, fruits, vermilion, three roosters, and Tapan (liquor) for the prosperity of the village. The Pahan sacrifices three roosters of different colors — each dedicated to the Sun, the village deities, and the ancestors. The Pahan places a water pot in Sarna and, on the following day, predicts the weather for the coming year. He also distributes Sal flowers among the villagers. People worship the souls of their ancestors at home and offer different types of food to them. Only after making these offerings do they eat. Afterward, they sing and dance to the beats of the Dhol, Nagara, and Mandar, while also drinking rice beer, Handia.

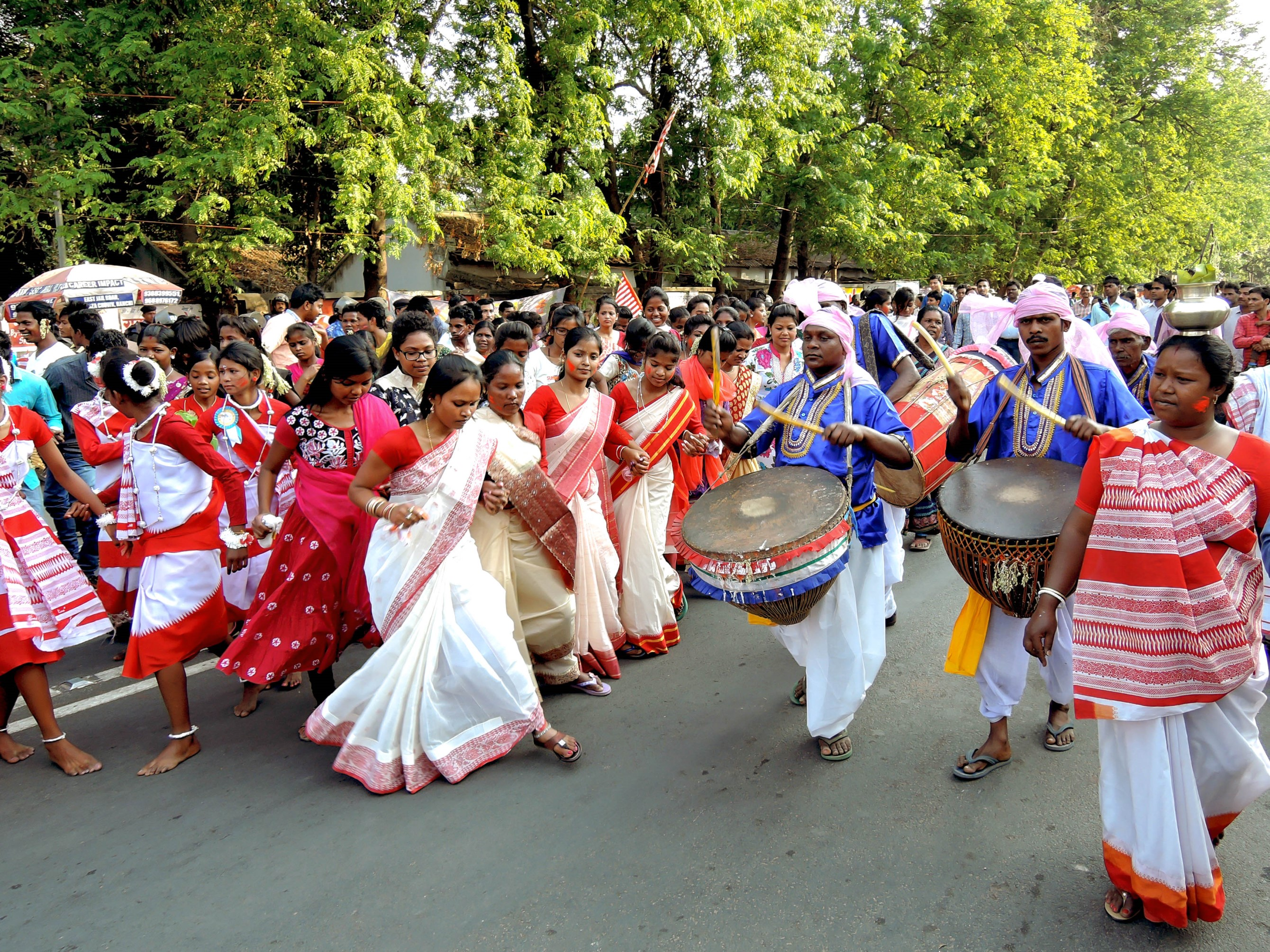
Sarhul dance procession in Ranchi

Since 1961, processions have been organized during the Sarhul festival in Ranchi and Gumla. Before that, there were no such processions; people only danced near Sarna sthal. In urban areas, middle-class tribal activists have reinvented the nature festival Sarhul to emphasize regional identity, while in rural areas, it remains primarily a thanksgiving ritual to the deities.

An Asur Sarhul song

== Similar festival ==
- Baha parab, a festival of Santhals.
