= Pahan =

Tribal priest

Pahan or Pāhan is a designation given to the tribal Sarna priest or religious head in Munda and Oraon villages. The position of Pahan is hereditary, and the Pujar serves as an assistant to the Pahan.

== See also ==
- Munda people
- Sarhul
