= Sohrai =

Harvest festival in East India

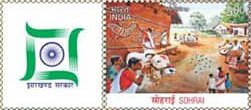
- Sohrai, Stamp of India - 2019
- Type: Cultural, seasonal
- Celebrations: Decoration and worshiping of cattles, performing rituals and feast
- Date: Kartik Amavasya
- Frequency: Annual
- Related to: Bandna

Sohrai is a harvest festival celebrated in the Indian states of Jharkhand, West Bengal, Chhattisgarh, Odisha, and Bihar. It is also called the cattle festival. The festival is observed after the harvest and coincides with Govardhan Puja during Diwali. In Santal Parganas, it is celebrated in the month of January. It is observed by the Santal, Bhumij, Sadan, Oraon, Ho and Munda communities, among others.

It is celebrated on Amavasya of the Hindu month of Kartik, which falls in October–November. In Santal Parganas, it is celebrated in January, between the 10th and 15th. During this festival, people fast, paint their houses, and prepare food. At night, they light earthen lamps in the cattle sheds and offer sacrifices to, the deity of animals.

== Celebration ==
Sohrai is a harvest festival celebrated after the harvest. It is observed on Amavasya (new moon) in the Hindu month of Kartik (October–November). The festival is celebrated in honor of cattle, especially bullocks, buffaloes, goats, and sheep. On this day, people fast throughout the day, and earthen lamps are lit in homes, cattle sheds, kitchens, and gardens. On the festival day, the animals are bathed, and their horns and foreheads are anointed with vermilion diluted in oil. Also They are offered a special meal of rice and vegetables. In the evening, a black chicken is sacrificed to Gaurea (the spirit of the cowshed), along with Tapan (fermented rice drink). The meat of the sacrificed chicken is then eaten with bread and Tapan. Sohrai is a day to express gratitude and affection for livestock. The harvest festival is also a time for people to showcase their artistic skills and expressions. Every year, after the festival is over, the drawings and patterns created during this time are erased. This festival usually takes place in October or November and lasts for three days. It coincides with Diwali. However, the Santals living in Santal Parganas celebrate it in January.

Sohrai folk song practiced during the festivities

== Arts ==
An indigenous art form is practised by the women. Ritualistic art is done on mud walls to welcome the harvest and to celebrate the cattle. The women clean their houses and decorate their walls with murals of Sohrai arts. This art form has continued since 10,000–4,000 BC. It was prevalent mostly in caves, but shifted to houses with mud walls.

An Asur Sohrai (harvest festival) song
