= Rajmahal Assembly constituency =

Rajmahal
- Constituency No. 1 for the Jharkhand Legislative Assembly

Constituency details
- Country: India
- Region: East India
- State: Jharkhand
- Division: Santhal Pargana
- District: Sahebganj
- Lok Sabha constituency: Rajmahal
- Established: 1951
- Reservation: None

Member of Legislative Assembly
- 6th Jharkhand Legislative Assembly
- Incumbent Md. Tajuddin
- Party: JMM
- Alliance: MGB
- Elected year: 2024

Rajmahal Assembly constituency is one of the 81 Legislative Assembly constituencies of Jharkhand state in eastern India. This constituency covers Rajmahal and Sahebganj Police Stations in Rajmahal sub-division of the district.

== Overview ==
Rajmahal (constituency number 1) is one of the three Jharkhand Legislative Assembly constituencies in Sahebganj district. It is one of the Assembly segments of the Rajmahal Lok Sabha constituency along with 5 other segments, namely, Borio and Barhait in this district and Litipara, Pakur and Maheshpur in Pakur district.

== Members of Legislative Assembly ==
Year	Member	Party
1952	Md. Burhanuddin Khan	Indian National Congress
1952	Jetha Kisku (Note: Rajmahal Damin)	Indian National Congress
1957	Binodanand Jha	Indian National Congress
1962	Binodanand Jha	Indian National Congress
1967	Nathmal Dokarai	Swatantra Party
1969	Om Prakash Roy	Bharatiya Jana Sangh
1972	Nathmal Dokania	Indian National Congress
1977	Dhruv Bhagat	Independent
1980	Dhruv Bhagat	Bharatiya Janata Party
1985	Dhruv Bhagat	Bharatiya Janata Party
1990	Raghu Nath Prasad Sodani	Indian National Congress
1995	Dhruv Bhagat	Bharatiya Janata Party
2000	Arun Mandal	Bharatiya Janata Party
2005	Thomas Hansda	Indian National Congress
2009	Arun Mandal	Bharatiya Janata Party
2014	Anant Kumar Ojha	Bharatiya Janata Party
2019	Anant Kumar Ojha	Bharatiya Janata Party
2024	Md. Tajuddin	Jharkhand Mukti Morcha

== Election results ==
=== Assembly election 2024 ===
2024 Jharkhand Legislative Assembly election: Rajmahal
Party	Candidate	Votes	%	±%
JMM	Md. Tajuddin	140,176	53.67	▲41.97
BJP	Anant Kumar Ojha	96,744	37.04	▼5.21
Independent	Sunil Yadav	14,012	5.37	New
JLKM	Motilal Sarkar	1,918	0.73	New
NOTA	None of the Above	3,058	1.17	▲0.78
Margin of victory		43,432	16.63	▲10.75
Turnout		2,61,163	73.41	▲3.71
Registered electors		3,55,762		▲17.85
JMM gain from BJP		Swing	▲11.42	

=== Assembly election 2019 ===
2019 Jharkhand Legislative Assembly election: Rajmahal
Party	Candidate	Votes	%	±%
BJP	Anant Kumar Ojha	88,904	42.26	▲2.55
AJSU	Md. Tajuddin	76,532	36.38	New
JMM	Ketabuddin Sekh	24,619	11.70	▼27.65
BSP	Pradip Kumar Singh	3,826	1.82	New
Independent	Gopal Chandra Mandal	2,617	1.24	New
Independent	Nitya Nand Gupta	2,614	1.24	New
Independent	Rajkishor Yadav	1,421	0.68	New
NOTA	None of the Above	821	0.39	▼0.77
Margin of victory		12,372	5.88	▲5.52
Turnout		2,10,394	69.70	▼2.58
Registered electors		3,01,867		▲11.82
BJP hold		Swing	▲2.55	

=== Assembly Election 2014 ===
2014 Jharkhand Legislative Assembly election: Rajmahal
Party	Candidate	Votes	%	±%
BJP	Anant Kumar Ojha	77,481	39.71	▲2.04
JMM	Md. Tajuddin	76,779	39.35	▲9.32
Independent	Bajrangi Prasad Yadav	18,866	9.67	New
CPI(M)	Md. Rafikul Alam	5,478	2.81	▼1.65
RJD	Arun Mandal	5,175	2.65	New
JD(U)	Sunil Kumar Sinha	2,125	1.09	New
JVM(P)	Krishna Mahto	1,617	0.83	New
NOTA	None of the Above	2,268	1.16	New
Margin of victory		702	0.36	▼7.28
Turnout		1,95,113	72.28	▲13.99
Registered electors		2,69,959		▲15.59
BJP hold		Swing	▲2.04	

=== Assembly Election 2009 ===
2009 Jharkhand Legislative Assembly election: Rajmahal
Party	Candidate	Votes	%	±%
BJP	Arun Mandal	51,277	37.67	▲22.41
JMM	Md. Tajuddin	40,874	30.03	New
INC	Thomas Hansda	14,782	10.86	▼14.86
AITC	Nazrul Islam	7,017	5.16	New
CPI(M)	Md. Moinuddin Shekh	6,065	4.46	▼9.51
LJP	Dhruv Bhagat	3,811	2.80	New
Independent	Binod Kumar Yadav	3,224	2.37	New
Margin of victory		10,403	7.64	▼0.24
Turnout		1,36,119	58.28	▼4.70
Registered electors		2,33,547		▲3.75
BJP gain from INC		Swing	▲11.95	

=== Assembly Election 2005 ===
2005 Jharkhand Legislative Assembly election: Rajmahal
Party	Candidate	Votes	%	±%
INC	Thomas Hansda	36,472	25.72	▲5.52
Independent	Arun Mandal	25,296	17.84	New
BJP	Kamal Krishna Bhagat	21,639	15.26	▼14.66
CPI(M)	Moinuddin Shekh	19,805	13.97	New
RJD	Ramchandra Keshri	11,254	7.94	▼1.71
NCP	Dhruv Bhagat	4,251	3.00	▼4.27
Independent	Md. Tajuddin	2,881	2.03	New
Margin of victory		11,176	7.88	▼1.81
Turnout		1,41,779	62.98	▲1.01
Registered electors		2,25,100		▲13.98
INC gain from BJP		Swing	▼4.19	

=== Assembly Election 2000 ===
2000 Bihar Legislative Assembly election: Rajmahal
Party	Candidate	Votes	%	±%
BJP	Arun Mandal	36,623	29.92	New
JMM	Najrul Islam	24,761	20.23	New
INC	Anil Kumar Sarkar	24,733	20.21	New
RJD	Dhruv Bhagat	11,804	9.64	New
NCP	Jayant Singh	8,900	7.27	New
Independent	Dara Singh Yadav	7,034	5.75	New
Independent	Farid Shaikh	5,224	4.27	New
Margin of victory		11,862	9.69	
Turnout		1,22,406	62.66	
Registered electors		1,97,497		
BJP win (new seat)				

== See also ==
- Rajmahal (community development block)
- Sahibganj (community development block)
- Rajmahal
- Sahibganj
- List of states of India by type of legislature
- Jharkhand Legislative Assembly
