= Murmu =

Murmu is a surname indicating a particular clan (paris) of the Santals found in India, Nepal, Bangladesh and Bhutan. The Kol tribe also bears the surname Murmu. The tribe resides in Jharkhand, Bihar, West Bengal, Odisha, and other states.

== Notable people ==
- Droupadi Murmu (born 1958) is an Indian politician who is the current President of India belongs to Murmu clan of Santal.
- Anthony Murmu, (27 October 1930 – 19 April 1985) an Indian politician. He was elected to the Lok Sabha from Rajmahal, Bihar as a member of the Janata Party.
- Bhagwat Murmu (28 February 1928 – 30 June 1998) social worker, first recipient of Padma Shri Award among Santal People, awarded on 16 March 1985 Member of Bihar Legislative Assembly, 1957-1962.
- Bhairav Murmu another sibling of great leader Sidhu Kanhu who also led the Santhal rebellion (1855–1856)
- Chami Murmu, (born c. 1973) a recipient of Nari Shakti Puraskar award in 2020.
- Chand Murmu sibling of great leader Sidhu Kanhu who also led the Santhal rebellion (1855–1856)
- Chandrani Murmu (born 16 June 1993) is an Indian politician, a youngest Indian Member of Parliament, from Keonjhar, Odisha in the 2019 Indian general election as a member of the Biju Janata Dal.
- Durga Murmu is an Indian politician. He was elected to the West Bengal Legislative Assembly from Phansidewa as a member of the Bharatiya Janata Party.
- G. C. Murmu (born 1959), Indian Administrative Service officer
- Hemlal Murmu, Indian politician and former MP from Rajmahal in 14th Lok Sabha
- Jauna Murmu (born 1990), Indian sprint runner and hurdler
- Joyel Murmu is an Indian politician.
- Sidhu Murmu (Sidhu Kanhu), a leader of the Santhal rebellion (1855–1856)
- Khagen Murmu, (born 2 February 1960) an Indian politician and a Member of Parliament from Maldaha Uttar (Lok Sabha constituency).
- Naresh Chandra Murmu (born 1 September 1971) Chief Scientist and Director of CSIR - Central Mechanical Engineering Research Institute Durgapur, West-Bengal, India. He was also acting Director of CSIR - National Metallurgical Laboratory Jamshedpur, Jharkhand, India
- Nathaniyal Murmu was an eminent Santal Social Reformer.
  - Nathaniyal Murmu Memorial College, a college at Tapan in the Dakshin Dinajpur district of West Bengal, India.
- Paika Murmu (15 January 1912 — ?) was an Indian politician. He was elected to the Lok Sabha, lower house of the Parliament of India from Rajmahal, Bihar as a member of the Indian National Congress.
- Paresh Murmu is an Indian politician member of All India Trinamool Congress.
- Rabindranath Murmu (born 1967/68) is an Indian Santali language writer from Jharkhand. He won Sahitya Akademi Award for Santali Translation in 2012.
- Raghunath Murmu (1905–1981), Indian linguist, inventor of the Ol Chiki script used in Santali language
  - Nayagram Pandit Raghunath Murmu Government College in Baligeria, West Bengal, India
  - Pandit Raghunath Murmu Medical College and Hospital, a Medical college and hospital in Baripada, Odisha, India
  - Pandit Raghunath Murmu Smriti Mahavidyalaya, a college in Baragari, Bankura, West Bengal, India
  - Pandit Raghunath Murmu Teachers Training College, a Training School in Murshidabad, West Bengal, India
  - Pandit Raghunath Murmu Tribal University in Jamshedpur, Jharkhand, India
  - Pt. Raghunath Academy Of Santali Cinema & Art, an academy formed to promote and develop Santali films, Jamshedpur, Jharkhand.
- Rupchand Murmu (born 1947), Indian politician, former MP
- Sadhu Ramchand Murmu, (30 April 1897 — 15 December 1954) a Santali Writer. His contributions are Sari Dhorom Serenj Puthi (2 parts-1969), Lita Godet (1979), Sonsar Phend (Drama), Isror (Verse), Ol Doho Onorhe (Poetry.
- Salkhan Murmu (born 1952), Indian socio-political activist, former MP from Mayurbhanj
- Sidha Lal Murmu (1 November 1935 – 4 June 1999) was an Indian politician.
- Sonu Murmu (Member of Federal Parliament of Nepal, 2022-2027)
- Kanhu Murmu, a leader of the Santhal rebellion (1855–1856)
  - Sidho Kanho Birsha University in West Bengal, India
  - Sidhu Kanhu Birsa Polytechnic in Keshiary, Paschim Medinipur district, West Bengal, India
  - Sido Kanhu Murmu University in Jharkhand, India
- Phulo Murmu & Jhano Murmu, Two sisters, Heroines of India’s Freedom movement (Santhal rebellion, 1855-1856)
  - Phulo Jhano Murmu College of Dairy Technology
  - Phulo Jhano Murmu Medical College and Hospital, a Medical college and hospital in Dumka, Jharkhand, India
- Tilka Majhi (Murmu) (11 February 1750 – 13 January 1785) was a notable tribal leader and revolutionary from present-day Bihar and Jharkhand, recognized as one of the earliest figures to rebel against British colonial oppression in India.
  - Tilka Majhi Bhagalpur University, formerly Bhagalpur University, is a public university in Bhagalpur, Bihar, India.
- Ravi Raj Murmu, Indian filmmaker and film editor
