= Rajmahal Lok Sabha constituency =

Lok Sabha constituency in Jharkhand

Coordinates: 25.1°N 87.8°E

Rajmahal JH-1
- Lok Sabha constituency
- Interactive Map Outlining Rajmahal Lok Sabha constituency

Constituency details
- Country: India
- Region: East India
- State: Jharkhand
- Assembly constituencies: Rajmahal; Borio; Barhait; Litipara; Pakur; Maheshpur
- Established: 1957
- Reservation: ST

Member of Parliament
- 18th Lok Sabha
- Incumbent Vijay Kumar Hansdak
- Party: JMM
- Alliance: INDIA
- Elected year: 2024
- Preceded by: Devidhan Besra

Rajmahal Lok Sabha constituency is one of the 14 Lok Sabha (parliamentary) constituencies in Jharkhand state in eastern India. This constituency covers the entire Sahebganj and Pakur districts. This constituency is reserved for the candidates belonging to the Scheduled tribes.

== Assembly segments ==
Presently, Rajmahal Lok Sabha constituency comprises the following six Vidhan Sabha (legislative assembly) segments:

#	Name	District	Member	Party	2024 Lead
1	Rajmahal	Sahebganj	Md. Tajuddin	JMM	JMM
2	Borio (ST)	Sahebganj	Dhananjay Soren	JMM	JMM
3	Barhait (ST)	Sahebganj	Hemant Soren	JMM	JMM
4	Litipara (ST)	Pakur	Hemlal Murmu	JMM	JMM
5	Pakur	Pakur	Nisat Alam	INC	JMM
6	Maheshpur (ST)	Pakur	Stephen Marandi	JMM	JMM

== Members of Parliament ==
Year	Member	Party
1957	Paika Murmu	Indian National Congress
1962	Iswar Marandi	Jharkhand Party
1967	Iswar Marandi	Jharkhand Party
1971	Iswar Marandi	Indian National Congress
1977	Anthony Murmu	Janata Party
1980	Seth Hembram	Indian National Congress (I)
1984	Seth Hembram	Indian National Congress
1989	Simon Marandi	Jharkhand Mukti Morcha
1991	Simon Marandi	Jharkhand Mukti Morcha
1996	Thomas Hansda	Indian National Congress
1998	Som Marandi	Bharatiya Janata Party
1999	Thomas Hansda	Indian National Congress
2004	Hemlal Murmu	Jharkhand Mukti Morcha
2009	Devidhan Besra	Bharatiya Janata Party
2014	Vijay Hansda	Jharkhand Mukti Morcha
2019	Vijay Hansda	Jharkhand Mukti Morcha
2024	Vijay Hansda	Jharkhand Mukti Morcha

== Elections results ==
=== 2024 ===
2024 Indian general election: Rajmahal
Party	Candidate	Votes	%	±%
JMM	Vijay Kumar Hansdak	613,371	50.35	
BJP	Tala Marandi	4,35,107	35.72	
Independent	Lobin Hembram	42,140	3.46	
CPI(M)	Gopen Soren	37,291	3.06	
NOTA	None of the above	18,217	1.50	
Majority		1,78,264	14.63	
Turnout		12,18,620	71.44	
JMM hold		Swing		

=== 2019 ===
2019 Indian general elections: Rajmahal
Party	Candidate	Votes	%	±%
JMM	Vijay Kumar Hansdak	507,830	48.47	
BJP	Hemlal Murmu	4,08,635	39.00	
CPI(M)	Gopen Soren	35,586	3.40	
AITC	Monika Kisku	17,427	1.66	
NOTA	None of the Above	12,919	1.23	
Majority		99,195	9.47	
Turnout		10,47,853	72.05	
JMM hold		Swing		

=== 2014 ===
2014 Indian general elections: Rajmahal
Party	Candidate	Votes	%	±%
JMM	Vijay Kumar Hansdak	379,507	39.88	
BJP	Hemlal Murmu	3,38,170	35.54	
JVM(P)	Dr. Anil Murmu	97,374	10.23	
CPI(M)	Jyotin Soren	58,034	6.10	
NOTA	None of the Above	19,875	2.09	
Majority		41,337	4.34	
Turnout		9,51,755	70.32	
JMM gain from BJP		Swing		

=== 2009 ===
2009 Indian general elections: Rajmahal
Party	Candidate	Votes	%	±%
BJP	Devidhan Besra	168,357	26.12	
JMM	Hemlal Murmu	1,59,374	24.73	
RJD	Thomas Hansda	1,17,048	18.16	
CPI(M)	Jyotin Soren	51,332	7.96	
Jharkhand Janadikhar Manch	Stephen Marandi	40,323	6.26	
Majority		8,983	1.39	
Turnout		6,44,500	55.18	
BJP gain from JMM		Swing		

=== 1977 ===
1977 Indian general election: Rajmahal (ST)
Party	Candidate	Votes	%	±%
JP	Father Anthoni Murmu	148,677	68.15	
INC	Yofesh Chandra Murmu	56,191	25.76	
BPHJ	Masis Soren	13,287	6.09	
Majority		92,486	42.39	
Turnout		224,290	39.95	
Swing to JP from INC		Swing		

=== 1971 ===
1971 Indian general election: Rajmahal (ST)
Party	Candidate	Votes	%	±%
INC	Iswar Marandi	55,958	44.77	
BPHJ	Justin Richard	37,193	29.76	
ABJS	Manik Marandi	20,276	16.22	
IND	Mark Kisku	4,080	3.26	
IND	Sawna Dehri	2,686	2.15	
IND	Sasiel Hembrom	2,276	1.82	
Jharkhand Party	Paul Hansda	1,490	1.19	
SWA	Robert Samuel Besra	1,032	0.83	
Majority		18,765	15.01	
Turnout		129,061	26.30	
INC hold		Swing		

=== 1967 ===
1967 Indian general election: Rajmahal (ST)
Party	Candidate	Votes	%	±%
INC	I. Marandi	41,515	27.89	
SWA	R. S. Besra	35,110	23.59	
IND	S. Murmu	27,567	18.52	
ABJS	R. Marandi	22,987	15.44	
IND	G. Murmu	11,792	7.92	
IND	N. Tudu	9,866	6.63	
Majority		6,405	4.30	
Turnout		156,295	34.38	
Swing to INC from Jharkhand Party		Swing		

=== 1962 ===
1962 Indian general election: Rajmahal (SC)
Party	Candidate	Votes	%	±%
Jharkhand Party	Iswar Marandi	74,666	52.81	
INC	Paika Murmu	55,990	39.60	
IND	Sabna Dehari	10,721	7.58	
Majority		18,676	13.21	
Turnout		149,409	38.38	
Swing to Jharkhand Party from INC		Swing		

=== 1957 ===
1957 Indian general election: Rajmahal (ST)
Party	Candidate	Votes	%	±%
INC	Paika Murmu	55,896	47.11	
Jharkhand Party	Robert Samuel Basera	53,449	45.05	
IND	Sudhir Hansda	5,854	4.93	
IND	Solomon Gokul Hembrom	3,441	2.90	
Majority		2,447	2.06	
Turnout		118,640	31.82	
INC win (new seat)				

== See also ==
- Sahebganj district
- Pakur district
- List of constituencies of the Lok Sabha
