= Barhait Assembly constituency =

Coordinates: 24°53′20″N 87°36′26″E

Barhait
- Constituency No. 3 for the Jharkhand Legislative Assembly

Constituency details
- Country: India
- Region: East India
- State: Jharkhand
- District: Sahebganj
- Lok Sabha constituency: Rajmahal
- Established: 2000
- Reservation: ST

Member of Legislative Assembly
- 5th Jharkhand Legislative Assembly
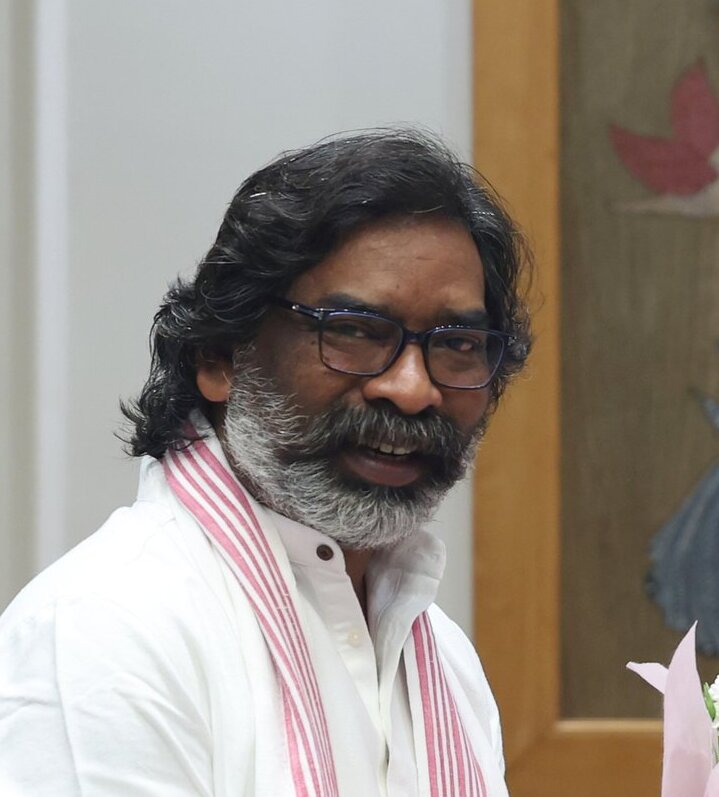
- Incumbent Hemant Soren; Chief Minister of Jharkhand
- Party: JMM
- Alliance: MGB
- Elected year: 2024
- Preceded by: Hemlal Murmu; JMM

Barhait Assembly constituency is an assembly constituency in the Indian state of Jharkhand. Chief minister of state represents this constituency.

== Overview ==
Barhait Assembly constituency covers: Barhait and Ranga Police Stations in Sahebganj district; and Sundarpahari Police Station and Rajabhita, Kero, Kairasol, Bara Telo and Barapipra gram panchayats in Boarijar Police station in Godda district.

This seat is reserved for Scheduled Tribes.

Barhait Assembly constituency is part of Rajmahal (Lok Sabha constituency).

== Members of the Legislative Assembly ==
Election	Member	Party
Bihar Legislative Assembly
Before 1957: Constituency did not exist
1957	Babulal Tudu	Jharkhand Party
1962	Babulal Tudu	Janata Party
1967	Masih Soren	Independent politician
1969	Masih Soren	Bihar Prant Hul Jharkhand
1972	Masih Soren	Independent politician
1977	Parmeshwar Hembrom	Janata Party
1980	Thomas Hansda	Indian National Congress
1985	Thomas Hansda	Indian National Congress
1990	Hemlal Murmu	Jharkhand Mukti Morcha
1995	Hemlal Murmu	Jharkhand Mukti Morcha
2000	Hemlal Murmu	Jharkhand Mukti Morcha
Jharkhand Legislative Assembly
2005	Thomas Soren	Jharkhand Mukti Morcha
2009	Hemlal Murmu	Jharkhand Mukti Morcha
2014	Hemant Soren	Jharkhand Mukti Morcha
2019	Hemant Soren	Jharkhand Mukti Morcha
2024	Hemant Soren	Jharkhand Mukti Morcha

== Election results ==
=== Assembly Election 2024 ===
2024 Jharkhand Legislative Assembly election: Barhait
Party	Candidate	Votes	%	±%
JMM	Hemant Soren	95,612	58.95%	▲5.46
BJP	Gamliyel Hembrom	55,821	34.42%	▼0.40
JLKM	Thomas Soren	2,181	1.34%	New
Independent	Sebastion Hembrom	1,781	1.10%	New
NOTA	None of the Above	3,469	2.14%	▲0.28
Margin of victory		39,791	24.53%	▲5.86
Turnout		1,62,197	71.81%	▲1.29
Registered electors		2,25,885		▲15.57
JMM hold		Swing	▲5.46	

=== Assembly Election 2019 ===
2019 Jharkhand Legislative Assembly election: Barhait
Party	Candidate	Votes	%	±%
JMM	Hemant Soren	73,725	53.49%	▲7.32
BJP	Simon Malto	47,985	34.82%	▲6.43
JVM(P)	Hopna Tudu	2,622	1.90%	▼8.56
AJSU	Gamliyel Hembrom	2,573	1.87%	New
LJP	Samuel Kumar Maraiya	1,844	1.34%	New
Independent	Lili Hansda	1,302	0.94%	New
Independent	Barnard Hembrom	1,209	0.88%	New
NOTA	Nota	2,566	1.86%	▲0.04
Margin of victory		25,740	18.68%	▲0.88
Turnout		1,37,822	70.51%	▼2.39
Registered electors		1,95,453		▲5.25
JMM hold		Swing	▲7.32	

=== Assembly Election 2014 ===
2014 Jharkhand Legislative Assembly election: Barhait
Party	Candidate	Votes	%	±%
JMM	Hemant Soren	62,515	46.18%	▲6.14
BJP	Hemlal Murmu	38,428	28.38%	▲19.03
JVM(P)	Simon Malto	14,161	10.46%	New
INC	Monika Kisku	7,151	5.28%	New
CPI(M)	Sanatan Murmu	3,555	2.63%	New
Independent	Mangal Hansda	1,274	0.94%	New
Independent	Chhoto Hansda	1,270	0.94%	New
NOTA	None of the Above	2,462	1.82%	New
Margin of victory		24,087	17.79%	▼2.24
Turnout		1,35,382	72.90%	▲12.34
Registered electors		1,85,700		▲10.86
JMM hold		Swing	▲6.14	

=== Assembly Election 2009 ===
2009 Jharkhand Legislative Assembly election: Barhait
Party	Candidate	Votes	%	±%
JMM	Hemlal Murmu	40,621	40.04%	▼5.88
Independent	Vijay Hansdak	20,303	20.01%	New
Independent	Simon Malto	14,163	13.96%	New
BJP	Manoj Murmu	9,490	9.35%	▼21.66
Independent	Thomas Soren	5,278	5.20%	New
Jharkhand Party	Michael Marandi	3,109	3.06%	New
RJD	Choto Hansda	2,224	2.19%	New
Margin of victory		20,318	20.03%	▲5.13
Turnout		1,01,448	60.56%	▲3.82
Registered electors		1,67,515		▲3.09
JMM hold		Swing	▼5.88	

=== Assembly Election 2005 ===
2005 Jharkhand Legislative Assembly election: Barhait
Party	Candidate	Votes	%	±%
JMM	Thomas Soren	42,332	45.92%	▼21.65
BJP	Simon Malto	28,593	31.02%	▲29.18
Independent	Samuel Murmu	3,893	4.22%	New
CPI	Ram Charan Kisku	2,741	2.97%	New
Independent	Chhoto Hansda	2,221	2.41%	New
Independent	Jarman Baski	2,111	2.29%	New
BSP	Mary Baski	2,103	2.28%	New
Margin of victory		13,739	14.90%	▼23.78
Turnout		92,190	56.74%	▼11.89
Registered electors		1,62,489		▲13.13
JMM hold		Swing	▼21.65	

=== Assembly Election 2000 ===
2000 Bihar Legislative Assembly election: Barhait
Party	Candidate	Votes	%	±%
JMM	Hemlal Murmu	66,599	67.56%	New
INC	Lourens Hansda	28,473	28.89%	New
BJP	Masih Soren	1,807	1.83%	New
RJD	Gyan Deo Tudu	524	0.53%	New
Margin of victory		38,126	38.68%	
Turnout		98,572	69.47%	
Registered electors		1,43,92		
JMM win (new seat)				

== See also ==
- Barhait (community development block)
- Boarijore
- Sunderpahari
- List of states of India by type of legislature
