= List of Sahitya Akademi Award winners for Santali =

List of winners of a literary honor in India

Sahitya Akademi Award for Santali
- Award for contributions to Santali literature
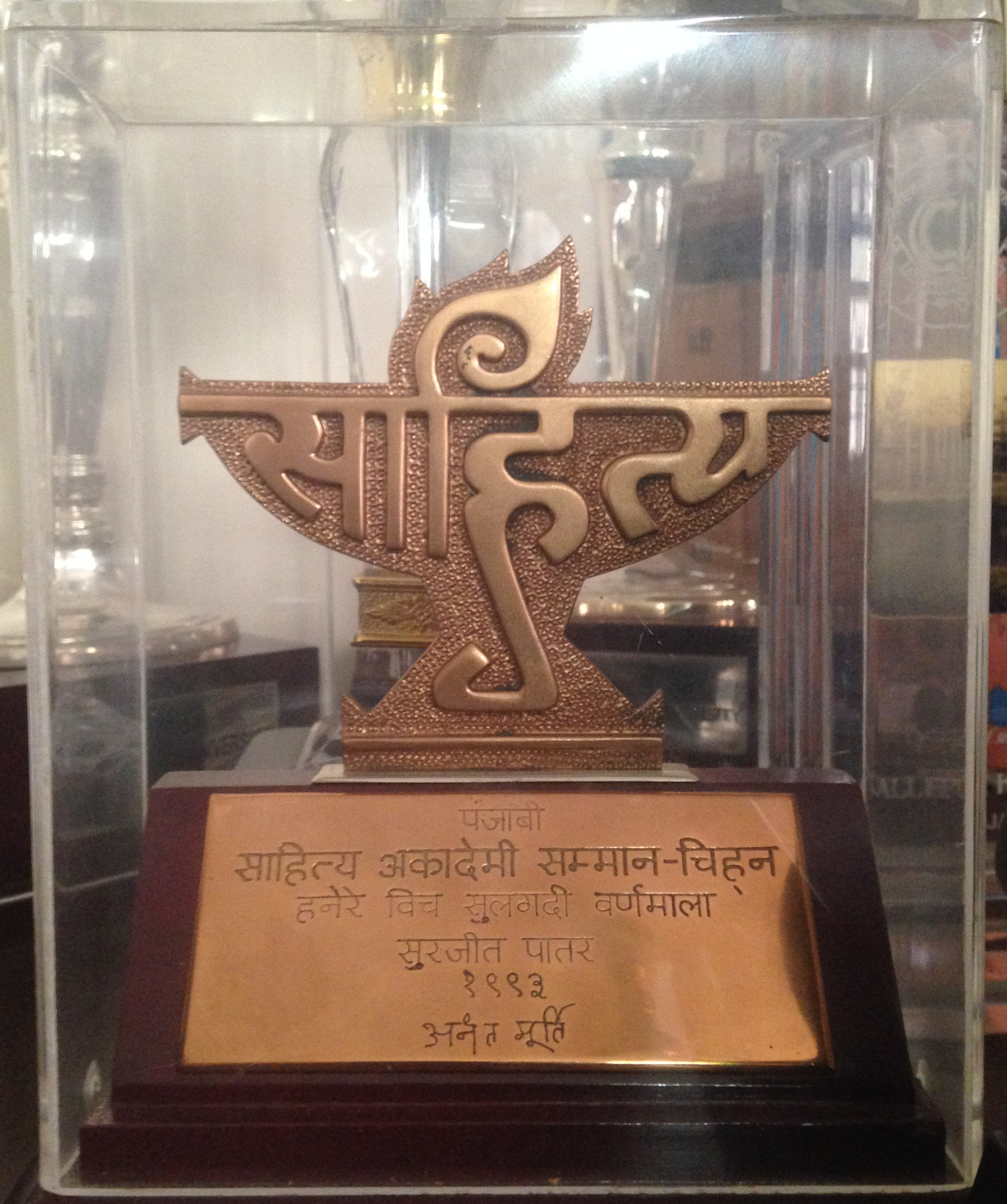
- Awarded for: Literary award in India
- Sponsored by: Sahitya Akademi, Government of India
- Reward: ₹1 lakh (US$1,100)
- First award: 2005
- Final award: 2025

Highlights
- Total awarded: 21
- First winner: Jadumani Besra
- Most Recent winner: Sumitra Soren
- Website: Official website

Part of a series on

Sahitya Akademi Awards
Category
Sahitya Akademi Award winners by language
- Assamese
- Bengali
- Bodo
- Dogri
- English
- Gujarati
- Hindi
- Kannada
- Kashmiri
- Konkani
- Maithili
- Malayalam
- Marathi
- Meitei (Manipuri)
- Nepali
- Odia
- Punjabi
- Rajasthani
- Sanskrit
- Santali
- Sindhi
- Tamil
- Telugu
- Urdu
Sahitya Akademi Translation Prizes
- Assamese
- Bengali
- Bodo
- Dogri
- English
- Gujarati
- Hindi
- Kannada
- Kashmiri
- Konkani
- Maithili
- Malayalam
- Marathi
- Meitei (Manipuri)
- Nepali
- Odia
- Punjabi
- Rajasthani
- Sanskrit
- Santali
- Sindhi
- Tamil
- Telugu
- Urdu
Sahitya Akademi Yuva Puraskar
- Assamese
- Bengali
- Bodo
- Dogri
- English
- Gujarati
- Hindi
- Kannada
- Kashmiri
- Konkani
- Maithili
- Malayalam
- Meitei (Manipuri)
- Marathi
- Nepali
- Odia
- Punjabi
- Rajasthani
- Sanskrit
- Santali
- Sindhi
- Tamil
- Telugu
- Urdu
Sahitya Akademi Bal Sahitya Puraskar
- Assamese
- Bengali
- Bodo
- Dogri
- English
- Gujarati
- Hindi
- Kannada
- Kashmiri
- Konkani
- Maithili
- Malayalam
- Meitei (Manipuri)
- Marathi
- Nepali
- Odia
- Punjabi
- Rajasthani
- Sanskrit
- Santali
- Sindhi
- Tamil
- Telugu
- Urdu
Related
- Eighth Schedule to the Constitution of India
- Official Languages Commission
- List of languages by number of native speakers in India

The Sahitya Akademi Award is an annual literary honour given to Indian writers. This list documents the Santali writers that have received the honour since 2005.

== Recipients ==
| Year | Portrait | Author | Work | |
|---|---|---|---|---|
| 2005 | — | Jadumani Besra | Bhabna (Poetry) | Poetry |
| 2006 | — | Ram Chandra Murmu | Guru Gomke Pondet Raghunath Murmu (Biography) | Biography |
| 2007 | | Kherwal Soren | Chet Re Cikayana (Play) | Play |
| 2008 | — | Badal Hembram | Manmi (Short Stories) | Short stories |
| 2009 | | Damayanti Beshra | Say Sahed (Poetry) | Poetry |
| 2010 | | Bhogla Soren | Rahi Ranwak’ Kana (Play) | Play |
| 2011 | — | Aditya Kumar Mandi | Banchao Larhai (Poetry) | Poetry |
| 2012 | | Gangadhar Hansda | Banchaw Akan Goj Hor (Short Stories) | Short stories |
| 2013 | — | Arjun Charan Hembram | Chanda Bonga (Poetry) | Poetry |
| 2014 | — | Jamadar Kisku | Mala Mudam (Play) | Play |
| 2015 | | Rabilal Tudu | Parsi Khatir (Play) | Play |
| 2016 | — | Gobinda Chandra Majhi | Nalha (Poetry) | Poetry |
| 2017 | — | Bhujanga Tudu | Tahena.n Tangi re (Poetry) | Poetry |
| 2018 | | Shyam Sundar Besra | Marom (Novel) | Novel |
| 2019 | — | Kali Charan Hembram | Sisirjali (Short Stories) | Short stories |
| 2020 | | Rupchand Hansda | Gur Dak Khasa Dak (Poetry) | Poetry |
| 2021 | — | Niranjan Hansda | Mane Rena Arhang (Short Stories) | Short stories |
| 2022 | — | Kajli Soren (Jagannath Soren) | Sabarnaka Balire Sanan’ Panjay (Poetry) | Poetry |
| 2023 | — | Turia Chand Baskey (Taraceen Baskey) | Jaba Baha (Short Stories) | Short stories |
| 2024 | | Maheswar Soren | Seched Sawnta Ren Andha Manmi (Play) | Play |
| 2025 | | Sumitra Soren | Mid Birna Chene Saon Inag Sagai (Short Story) | Short stories |

== Translation into Santali ==
There have been writers that have been awarded the Sahitya Akademi Award for translating literary works into Santali.

- 2010 : Sobha Nath Beshra for Rahla Raybar (translated from Sanskrit)
- 2011 : Thakurdas Murmu for Santal Pahra (Voi. I & 11) (translated from Odiya)
- 2012 : Rabindranath Murmu for Ita Chetan Re Ita (translated from Bangla)
- 2013 : Mangal Majhi for Malang Anal (translated from Bangla)
- 2015 : Tala Tudu for Baplanij (translated from Bangla)
- 2016 : Ganesh Thakur Hansda for Bhognadi Reyak Dahire (translated from Bangla).
- 2017 : Surya Singh Besra for Matkom Rasa (translated from Hindi).
- 2018 : Rupchand Hansda for Sen Dareyak'an Menkhan Chedak (translated from Bangla).
