= Borio Assembly constituency =

Borio
- Constituency No. 2 for the Jharkhand Legislative Assembly

Constituency details
- Country: India
- Region: East India
- State: Jharkhand
- District: Sahebganj
- Lok Sabha constituency: Rajmahal
- Established: 2000
- Total electors: 2,50,607
- Reservation: ST

Member of Legislative Assembly
- 5th Jharkhand Legislative Assembly
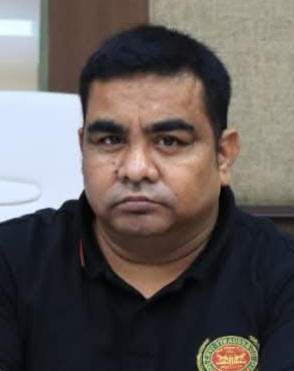
- Incumbent Dhananjay Soren
- Party: JMM
- Alliance: MGB
- Elected year: 2024

Borio Assembly constituency is an assembly constituency in the Indian state of Jharkhand. Borio was a part of Santhal Pargana district in undivided Bihar but is now part of the Sahibganj district.

== Overview ==
Borio Assembly constituency covers: Borio and Taljhari Police Stations in Sahebganj district and Boarijor Police Station (excluding Rajabhita, Kero, Kairasol, Bara Telo and Barapipra gram panchayats) in Godda district.

This seat is reserved for Scheduled Tribes.

Borio Assembly constituency is part of Rajmahal (Lok Sabha constituency).

== Members of Legislative Assembly ==
Election	Member	Party
Bihar Legislative Assembly
Before 1957: Constituency did not exist
1957	Jetha Kisku	Jharkhand Party
1962	Singrai Murmu	Janata Party
1967	Jetha Kisku	Swatantra Party
1969	Seth Hembrom	Bihar Prant Hul Jharkhand
1972	Seth Hembrom	Bihar Prant Hul Jharkhand
1977	Benjamin Murmu	Janata Party
1980	John Hembrom	Indian National Congress
1985	John Hembrom	Indian National Congress
1990	Lobin Hembrom	Jharkhand Mukti Morcha
1995	Lobin Hembrom	Independent politician
2000	Lobin Hembrom	Jharkhand Mukti Morcha
Jharkhand Legislative Assembly
2005	Tala Marandi	Bharatiya Janata Party
2009	Lobin Hembrom	Jharkhand Mukti Morcha
2014	Tala Marandi	Bharatiya Janata Party
2019	Lobin Hembrom	Jharkhand Mukti Morcha
2024	Dhananjay Soren	Jharkhand Mukti Morcha

== Election results ==
=== Assembly Election 2024 ===
2024 Jharkhand Legislative Assembly election: Borio
Party	Candidate	Votes	%	±%
JMM	Dhananjay Soren	97,317	50.79	▲3.40
BJP	Lobin Hembrom	78,044	40.73	▲4.32
JLKM	Suryanarayan Hansda	2,937	1.53	New
Independent	Rama Paharia	2,251	1.17	New
NOTA	None of the Above	3,566	1.86	▲0.22
Margin of victory		19,273	10.06	▼0.92
Turnout		1,91,590	67.32	▲2.19
Registered electors		2,84,593		▲13.56
JMM hold		Swing	▲3.40	

=== Assembly Election 2019 ===
2019 Jharkhand Legislative Assembly election: Borio
Party	Candidate	Votes	%	±%
JMM	Lobin Hembrom	77,365	47.40	▲11.57
BJP	Surya Narayan Hansada	59,441	36.42	▲0.14
AJSU	Tala Marandi	8,955	5.49	New
CPI	Sonaram Madaiya	2,705	1.66	▼0.69
JD(U)	Lukas Hansda	2,181	1.34	New
BSP	Lakhan Pahadiya	1,960	1.20	New
Peoples Party of India (Democratic)	Manoj Tudu	1,584	0.97	New
NOTA	Nota	2,687	1.65	▼0.36
Margin of victory		17,924	10.98	▲10.53
Turnout		1,63,232	65.13	▼2.72
Registered electors		2,50,607		▲7.15
JMM gain from BJP		Swing	▲11.12	

=== Assembly Election 2014 ===
2014 Jharkhand Legislative Assembly election: Borio
Party	Candidate	Votes	%	±%
BJP	Tala Marandi	57,565	36.27	▲11.23
JMM	Lobin Hembrom	56,853	35.82	▲2.85
JVM(P)	Surya Narayan Hansda	26,823	16.90	▼5.77
CPI	Sona Ram Madaiya	3,731	2.35	New
INC	Manju Snehlata Hembrom	2,673	1.68	New
IUML	Krishna Singh	1,528	0.96	New
Independent	Elias Murmu	1,312	0.83	New
NOTA	None of the Above	3,182	2.01	New
Margin of victory		712	0.45	▼7.48
Turnout		1,58,698	67.86	▲11.76
Registered electors		2,33,878		▲15.11
BJP gain from JMM		Swing	▲3.30	

=== Assembly Election 2009 ===
2009 Jharkhand Legislative Assembly election: Borio
Party	Candidate	Votes	%	±%
JMM	Lobin Hembrom	37,586	32.98	▼1.12
BJP	Tala Marandi	28,546	25.05	▼14.69
JVM(P)	Surya Nrayan Hansda	25,835	22.67	New
Independent	Rama Paharia	3,723	3.27	New
Independent	Sunita Hansda	3,114	2.73	New
CPI(M)	Prabhawati Baskey	3,111	2.73	New
Independent	Ramkrishna Soren	2,109	1.85	New
Margin of victory		9,040	7.93	▲2.30
Turnout		1,13,973	56.09	▼2.21
Registered electors		2,03,182		▲5.67
JMM gain from BJP		Swing	▼6.76	

=== Assembly Election 2005 ===
2005 Jharkhand Legislative Assembly election: Borio
Party	Candidate	Votes	%	±%
BJP	Tala Marandi	44,546	39.74	▲22.13
JMM	Lobin Hembrom	38,227	34.10	▼4.65
Independent	Khudu Murmu	7,083	6.32	New
NCP	Mahesh Malto	4,295	3.83	New
Independent	Sunil Hansdak	3,517	3.14	New
Independent	Nazarati Soren	3,496	3.12	New
JDP	Kasrai Soren	1,947	1.74	New
Margin of victory		6,319	5.64	▼1.52
Turnout		1,12,106	58.30	▲3.16
Registered electors		1,92,282		▲13.58
BJP gain from JMM		Swing	▲0.99	

=== Assembly Election 2000 ===
2000 Bihar Legislative Assembly election: Borio
Party	Candidate	Votes	%	±%
JMM	Lobin Hembrom	36,170	38.74	New
INC	Tala Marandi	29,491	31.59	New
BJP	Thakur Hansda	16,435	17.60	New
CPI	Munshi Marandi	3,848	4.12	New
RJD	Babiyana Baski	2,763	2.96	New
Independent	Bishnudeo Singh	1,895	2.03	New
Bhartiya Jana Congress (Rashtriya)	Arun Kumar Besara	964	1.03	New
Margin of victory		6,679	7.15	
Turnout		93,355	56.12	
Registered electors		1,69,295		
JMM win (new seat)				

== See also ==
- Vidhan Sabha
- List of states of India by type of legislature
- Borio (community development block)
- Taljhari
- Boarijore
