= Shoshit Dal =

Political party in India (1967–1972)

- President: B. P. Mandal
- Founder: Jagdeo Prasad; B. P. Mandal
- Founded: 1967
- Dissolved: 1972
- Split from: Samyukta Socialist Party
- Merged into: Shoshit Samaj Dal
- Ideology: Socialism
- Political position: Centre to Centre-left

The Shoshit Dal (lit. 'Party of the Exploited') was a regional political party in Bihar, India, founded by Jagdeo Prasad and B. P. Mandal in March 1967. The party emerged after Mandal split from the Samyukta Socialist Party over disagreements with Ram Manohar Lohia's leadership. In early 1968, the Shoshit Dal, with the support of the Congress party, formed the first ever OBC-led government in Northern India with B. P. Mandal as the Chief Minister of Bihar.

== Rise and fall of Shoshit Dal ==
Within a year of the party's formation, Shoshit Dal founder B. P. Mandal successfully drew 40 lower-caste MLA dissidents from the Samyukta Socialist Party and other parties and engineered a coalition to topple the Samyukta Vidhayak Dal (SVD) government. With the external support of the Indian National Congress, the party prepared to form a new ministry. However, because Mandal was a sitting Member of Parliament (MP) in the Lok Sabha rather than a member of the state legislature, Shoshit Dal MLA Satish Prasad Singh was chosen as a stopgap leader and sworn in as Chief Minister on 28 January 1968. Singh served for a brief tenure of four days. Once Mandal was successfully sworn in as a Member of the Legislative Council (MLC), he took the oath as the seventh Chief Minister on 1 February 1968, and became the first OBC chief minister of Bihar. Despite making history by forming a cabinet dominated by Other Backward Classes (OBC) ministers, the Shoshit Dal led government lasted for about one month. The government fell when a group of 17 Congress defectors led by Binodanand Jha withdrew their support and favoured the no-confidence motion moved by Karpoori Thakur, a leader of Samyukta Socialist Party.

The Shoshit Dal won six seats in the next 1969 Bihar Legislative Assembly election. In 1972, the party officially merged with Ramswaroop Verma's Samaj Dal to form the Shoshit Samaj Dal, spearheaded by Jagdeo Prasad.

== List of chief ministers ==
No.	Name	Constituency	Term of office		Tenure length	Assembly	Notes
1	Satish Prasad Singh	Parbatta	28 January 1968	1 February 1968	4 days	4th Assembly (1967 election)	
2	B. P. Mandal	MLC	1 February 1968	2 March 1968	30 days	4th Assembly (1967 election)	
