= Litipara Assembly constituency =

Litipara
- Constituency No. 4 for the Jharkhand Legislative Assembly

Constituency details
- Country: India
- Region: East India
- State: Jharkhand
- District: Pakur
- Lok Sabha constituency: Rajmahal
- Established: 2000
- Total electors: 1,99,843
- Reservation: ST

Member of Legislative Assembly
- 5th Jharkhand Legislative Assembly
- Incumbent Hemlal Murmu
- Party: JMM
- Alliance: MGB
- Elected year: 2024

Litipara Assembly constituency is an assembly constituency in the Indian state of Jharkhand.

Litipara Assembly constituency is part of Rajmahal (Lok Sabha constituency).

== Overview ==
Litipara Assembly constituency covers: Litipara, Amrapara and Hiranpur Police Stations in Pakaur district; and Gopikandar Police Station in Dumka district.

This seat is reserved for Scheduled Tribes.

Litipara Assembly constituency is part of Rajmahal (Lok Sabha constituency).

== Members of Legislative Assembly ==
Election	Member	Party
Bihar Legislative Assembly
Before 1957: Constituency did not exist
1957	Ramcharan Kisku	Jharkhand Party
1962	Ramcharan Kisku	Janata Party
1967	B. Murmu	Independent politician
1969	Som Murmu	Bihar Prant Hul Jharkhand
1972	Som Murmu	Bihar Prant Hul Jharkhand
1977	Simon Marandi	Independent politician
1980	Simon Marandi	Jharkhand Mukti Morcha
1985	Simon Marandi	Jharkhand Mukti Morcha
1990	Sushila Hansdak	Jharkhand Mukti Morcha
1995	Sushila Hansdak	Jharkhand Mukti Morcha
2000	Sushila Hansdak	Jharkhand Mukti Morcha
Jharkhand Legislative Assembly
2005	Sushila Hansdak	Jharkhand Mukti Morcha
2009	Simon Marandi	Jharkhand Mukti Morcha
2014	Dr. Anil Murmu	Jharkhand Mukti Morcha
2017^	Simon Marandi	Jharkhand Mukti Morcha
2019	Dinesh William Marandi	Jharkhand Mukti Morcha
2024	Hemlal Murmu	Jharkhand Mukti Morcha

^by-election

== Election results ==
=== Assembly Election 2024 ===
2024 Jharkhand Legislative Assembly election: Litipara
Party	Candidate	Votes	%	±%
JMM	Hemlal Murmu	88,469	53.97%	▲7.73
BJP	Babudhan Murmu	61,720	37.65%	▲1.05
Independent	Nirmal Murmu	2,470	1.51%	New
Independent	Raska Hembram	1,728	1.05%	New
JLKM	Mark Baskey	1,589	0.97%	New
NCP	Shivcharan Malto	1,585	0.97%	New
Navyug Pragatisheel Morcha	Johan Kisku	1,397	0.85%	New
NOTA	None of the Above	3,327	2.03%	▼0.21
Margin of victory		26,749	16.32%	▲6.68
Turnout		1,63,925	75.25%	▲3.09
Registered electors		2,17,847		▲9.01
JMM hold		Swing	▲7.73	

=== Assembly Election 2019 ===
2019 Jharkhand Legislative Assembly election: Litipara
Party	Candidate	Votes	%	±%
JMM	Dinesh William Marandi	66,675	46.24%	▼1.04
BJP	Daniel Kisku	52,772	36.60%	▼1.38
JVM(P)	Raska Hembram	7,195	4.99%	▼1.65
CPI(M)	Devendra Dehri	5,244	3.64%	New
AITC	Shivcharan Malto	2,604	1.81%	New
Independent	Mark Baskey	1,691	1.17%	New
Independent	Rajeev Malto	1,595	1.11%	New
NOTA	Nota	3,228	2.24%	▲0.33
Margin of victory		13,903	9.64%	▲0.34
Turnout		1,44,199	72.16%	▼0.74
Registered electors		1,99,843		▲5.08
JMM hold		Swing	▼1.04	

=== Assembly By-election 2017 ===
2017 Jharkhand Legislative Assembly by-election: Litipara
Party	Candidate	Votes	%	±%
JMM	Simon Marandi	65,551	47.28%	▲1.35
BJP	Hemlal Murmu	52,651	37.98%	▲9.19
JVM(P)	Kistu Soren	9,208	6.64%	▲0.65
Independent	Jyotish Baski	2,190	1.58%	New
Independent	Jantu Soren	2,033	1.47%	New
Independent	Shivcharan Malto	1,893	1.37%	New
Independent	Dr. Shrilal Kisku	1,652	1.19%	New
NOTA	Nota	2,646	1.91%	New
Margin of victory		12,900	9.30%	▼7.84
Turnout		1,38,643	72.90%	▼3.06
Registered electors		1,90,188		▼1.26
JMM hold		Swing	▲1.35	

=== Assembly Election 2014 ===
2014 Jharkhand Legislative Assembly election: Litipara
Party	Candidate	Votes	%	±%
JMM	Dr. Anil Murmu	67,194	45.93%	▲14.48
BJP	Simon Marandi	42,111	28.78%	▲8.95
INC	Shivcharan Malto	12,434	8.50%	▼17.27
JVM(P)	Daniel Kisku	8,771	5.99%	New
CPI(M)	Devendra Dehari	5,491	3.75%	New
Independent	Wakil Besra	2,976	2.03%	New
Independent	Gupin Hembrom	2,426	1.66%	New
NOTA	None of the Above	3,460	2.36%	New
Margin of victory		25,083	17.14%	▲11.46
Turnout		1,46,306	75.96%	▲14.11
Registered electors		1,92,609		▲25.41
JMM hold		Swing	▲14.48	

=== Assembly Election 2009 ===
2009 Jharkhand Legislative Assembly election: Litipara
Party	Candidate	Votes	%	±%
JMM	Simon Marandi	29,875	31.45%	▼0.83
INC	Dr. Anil Murmu	24,478	25.77%	New
BJP	Thakur Hansda	18,842	19.84%	▼4.61
Independent	Daniel Kisku	4,463	4.70%	New
AITC	James Murmu	3,911	4.12%	New
RSP	Jantu Soren	2,593	2.73%	New
Independent	Manoj Marandi	2,505	2.64%	New
Margin of victory		5,397	5.68%	▼2.15
Turnout		94,990	61.85%	▲1.70
Registered electors		1,53,589		▲0.55
JMM hold		Swing	▼0.83	

=== Assembly Election 2005 ===
2005 Jharkhand Legislative Assembly election: Litipara
Party	Candidate	Votes	%	±%
JMM	Sushila Hansdak	29,661	32.28%	▼14.40
BJP	Simon Marandi	22,464	24.45%	▲8.15
Independent	Dr. Anil Murmu	22,116	24.07%	New
Independent	Jitendra Malto	4,136	4.50%	New
Independent	Shivcharan Malto	3,637	3.96%	New
JDP	Jantu Soren	2,496	2.72%	New
Independent	Stefan Murmu	2,280	2.48%	New
Margin of victory		7,197	7.83%	▼6.03
Turnout		91,878	60.15%	▲5.27
Registered electors		1,52,751		▲10.58
JMM hold		Swing	▼14.40	

=== Assembly Election 2000 ===
2000 Bihar Legislative Assembly election: Litipara
Party	Candidate	Votes	%	±%
JMM	Sushila Hansdak	35,391	46.68%	New
INC	Stephan Soren	24,881	32.82%	New
BJP	Chhutar Kisku	12,361	16.30%	New
RJD	Jhano Rewati Tudu	1,814	2.39%	New
CPI	Rishi Kishku	792	1.04%	New
NCP	Helena Murmu	575	0.76%	New
Margin of victory		10,510	13.86%	
Turnout		75,814	55.93%	
Registered electors		1,38,141		
JMM win (new seat)				

== See also ==
- Littipara block
- Amrapara block
- Hiranpur block
- Gopikandar
- List of states of India by type of legislature
