= Tala Marandi =

Indian politician

Member of the Jharkhand Legislative Assembly
- In office 23 December 2014 – 21 December 2019
- Preceded by: Lobin Hembrom
- Succeeded by: Lobin Hembrom
- Constituency: Borio
- In office 27 February 2005 – 23 December 2009
- Preceded by: Lobin Hembrom
- Succeeded by: Lobin Hembrom
- Constituency: Borio

Personal details
- Born: Tala Marandi; 1963 (age 62–63) Ithari, Baghmara Boarijore, Godda, Jharkhand
- Citizenship: India
- Party: Bharatiya Janata Party (2003 - 2025) Jharkhand Mukti Morcha (2025 - Present)
- Parent: Badan Marandi
- Education: B.Com graduated from Marwari College, Bhagalpur Tilka Manjhi Bhagalpur University, Bhagalpur, Bihar 1984
- Occupation: Social Work, Politics and Business

Tala Marandi is an Indian politician and member of the Jharkhand Mukti Morcha. Marandi was two-times member of the Jharkhand Legislative Assembly from the Borio constituency in Sahebganj district in 2005 -2009 and 2014 - 2019. Mr Marandi was a candidate for Lok Sabha in 2024 Indian general election from Rajmahal Lok Sabha constituency in June 2024 was defeated by 1,78,264 votes from Vijay Kumar Hansdak from JMM.

== Political journey ==
Tala Marandi, a commerce graduate from Tilka Manjhi Bhagalpur University was a long-time social worker in the Godda district in Santhal Pargana Division of present day Jharkhand. Before coming into BJP, he was with INC and had unsuccessfully contested 2000 assembly election on INC ticket. He joined BJP in 2003 and in 2005 he was the first elected Member of the Jharkhand Legislative Assembly from Borio Assembly constituency on BJP ticket but he has defeated by Lobin Hembrom leader from JMM in 2009. He was the member of BJP executive committee. Mr Marandi was also one of the prominent leaders in BJP. He joins Jharkhand Mukti Morcha after his resignation from BJP, same day in presence of Jharkhand CM Hemant Soren.
