= Jagdeo Prasad =

Indian politician (1922–1974)

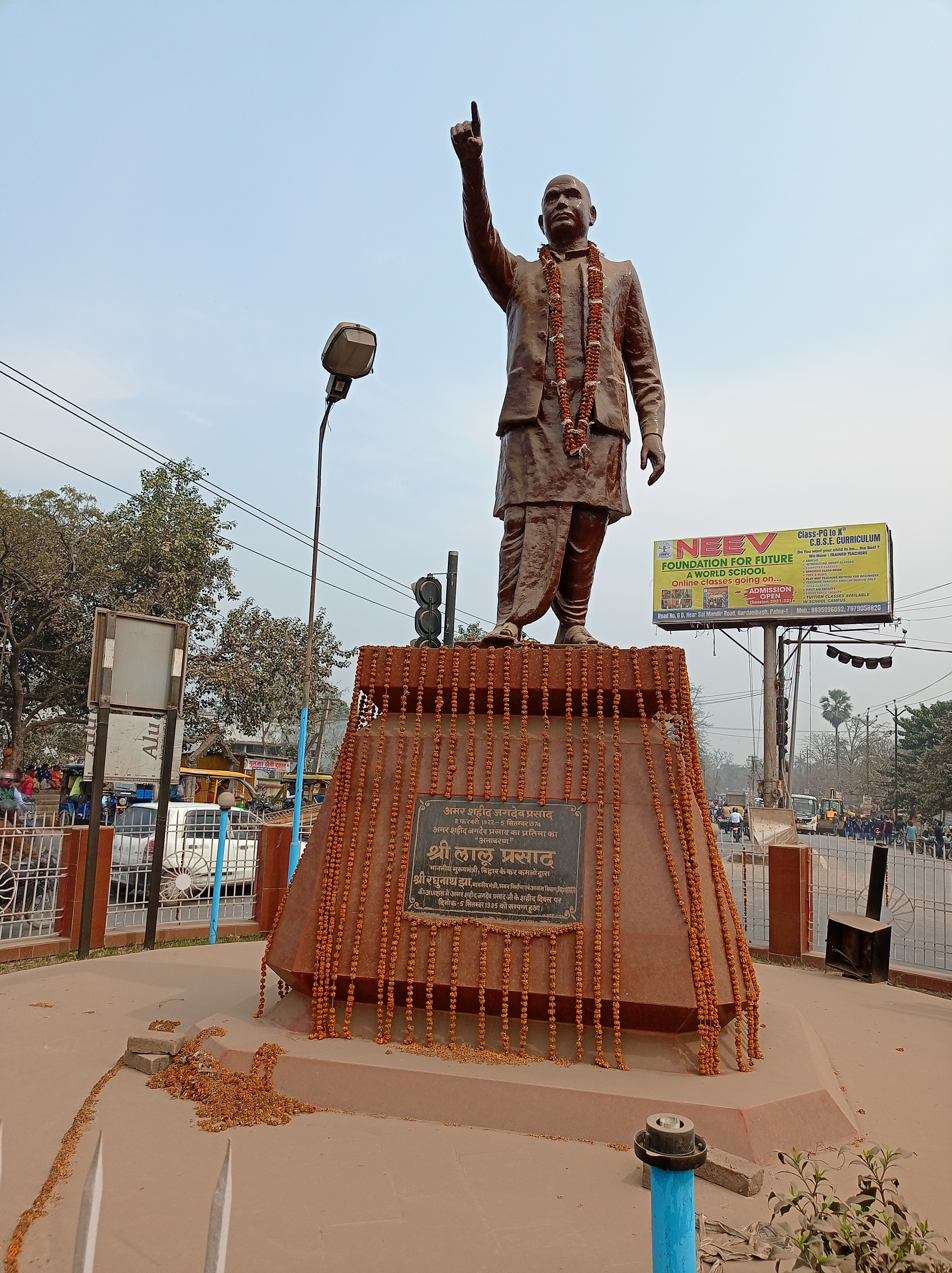
- Statue of Jagdeo Prasad near Jagdeo Path, Bir Chand Patel Path (Patna)
- Born: February 2, 1922; Kurhari, Jahanabad district, Bihar, India
- Died: September 5, 1974 (aged 52); Kurtha, Jahanabad district, Bihar, India
- Education: Patna University
- Political party: Shoshit Samaj Dal
- Movement: Bihar Movement
- Parents: Prayag Narayan Dangi (father); Raskali (mother)

Jagdev Prasad (2 February 1922 – 5 September 1974) and popularly known as Jagdev Babu, was an Indian politician and a member of the Bihar Legislative Assembly who served as Bihar's deputy chief minister in 1968 for four days in the Satish Prasad Singh cabinet. A great socialist and a proponent of Arjak culture, he was the founder of Shoshit Dal (later Shoshit Samaj Dal) and was a staunch antagonist and critic of India's caste system. He was nicknamed as the "Lenin of Bihar".

== Biography ==
Prasad was a member of the Dangi people caste, and was referred to as the "Lenin of Bihar" due to his charisma. He led the Shoshit Samaj Dal and during the early 1970s, at the height of the caste tensions known as the Bihar Movement, he was able to attract much support from both members of the Other Backward Classes and the Dalits in their opposition to upper-caste landlords. Jagdeo Prasad's son, Nagmani is a veteran politician who started his career from his father's party itself. He later joined Rashtriya Janata Dal and remained minister in RJD government. The former Chief Minister of Bihar, Satish Prasad Singh, who held the office for shortest tenure in Bihar's history as a nominee of Shoshit Samaj Dal, was brother in law of Jagdeo Prasad.

Born in Kurhari village, Jahanabad district of Bihar, Jagdeo Prasad went to Jahanabad town for higher studies. He further moved to Patna University, from where he pursued his post graduation. Prasad is said to have revolutionary mindset since his early childhood, as in his adolescence, he fought to end prevailing practices like "Panchkathia System", in which farmers had to leave 5 katta of their land for the elephant of landlord to graze.

Later, he came into contact with Chandradeo Prasad Verma, who persuaded him to study the political philosophers to know the prevalent societal condition in depth. Prasad agreed and soon he became sympathetic to ideology of socialism; he joined Samyukta Socialist Party and in the days of ideological wars between Ram Manohar Lohia and Jayprakash Narayan, he chose to go with Lohia. Jagdeo also became editor of the magazine of SSP called Janata. Later he moved to Hyderabad and started editing two more magazines Uday and Citizen. His ideas brought great fame to the magazines but he had to face intimidation from orthodox section of society. This led him to leave the magazine and move to Patna once again.

Though, initially he remained an active member of SSP, he later realised that the fruits of labour of many are reaped by few in the party and given his ideological difference with Lohia, he resigned and formed a new party called Shoshit Samaj Party (SSP). He also remained active member of Arjak Sangh, a platform led by Ramswaroop Verma. The Shoshit Samaj Party was more a revolutionary organisation than a political party as it urged the landless labourers to grab the lands of landlords, a practice which gave rise to a number of caste armies and private senas in Bihar.

"Das ka shashan nabbe par,
Nahin chalega, nahin chalega
Sau mein nabbe shoshit hain,
Nabbe bhag hamara hai,
Dhan, dharti aur rajpaat mein,
Nabbe bhaag hamara hai"

"The rule of ten over ninety cannot continue
Ninety of hundred are exploited
We are owners of ninety parts
We have ninety per cent share in wealth, land and power"

— Jagdeo Prasad

Due to his critic of upper caste dominance, Prasad many a times is branded as Anti-forward caste. He remained Deputy Chief Minister of Bihar for a brief period of time when SSP was at peak. Prasad was called as Bihar's Lenin in his lifetime due to his radical views, he also coined the politically radical slogan of:

"Abki saal ke bhadon mein, gori ungli kado mein (next paddy sowing season will see the slim white fingers of upper caste women in mud, transplanting paddy)"

Prasad was also a firm believer in the principles of Arjak Sangh. As a consequence of which, he became a critic of priesthood and the numerous rituals promoted by the Brahmin priests. His ideology was primarily based on welfare of the Backwards. As a result of his activism, many people belonging to Kushwaha community stopped calling Brahmins for any of their rituals.

=== Formation of first Backward Caste led government ===
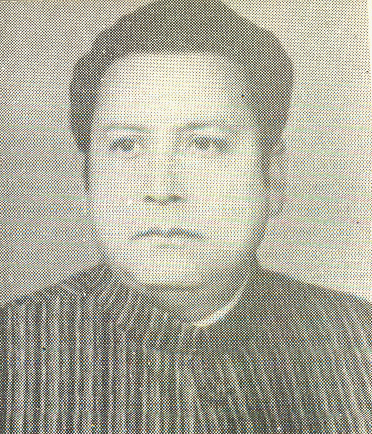
Historic portrait of Satish Prasad Singh; Singh was Chief Minister of Bihar for shortest tenure. He assumed the premiership after Shoshit Samaj Party aligned with Congress.

In 1967, Prasad was with Ram Manohar Lohia and the formation of first non-Congress government took place in the state of Bihar. The erstwhile governments used to remain dominated by the forward castes and Lohia had coined a slogan: Sansopa ki yahi hai maang, picchda pawe sau me sath (the Samyukta Socialist Party demands 60% share in the power for the Backwards). Prasad was attracted to Lohia, because of his claim to get proper representation for the Other Backward Class (OBCs) in the new government. But, in this government, the Backward Caste leaders were not given proper representation. In fact, as per reports, the less educated upper caste leaders were given important ministerial portfolios and the highly educated Backward Caste leaders were allotted ministerial births of minor significance. Prasad, hence toppled the government by causing a defection of his loyal MLAs (Mahamaya Prasad Sinha was heading this government ). He formed his own party called Shoshit Samaj Dal and this party became instrumental in forming the governments between 1967 and 1972. In this period, different governments were formed, but since the ambition of Prasad of giving the OBCs representation they need was not being fulfilled, he used to pull out his support and toppled every government in the end.

Prasad later played important role in formation of first Backward Caste led government in the state of Bihar. This government was supported by 31 MLAs loyal to Prasad as well as Indian National Congress's MLAs. Satish Prasad Singh and Bindeshwari Prasad Mandal were appointed as Chief Ministers consecutively.

Prasad was killed by police on 5 September 1974 while leading a protest involving 20,000 people. There have been claims that his death was ordered by a minister in the Government of Bihar, although police said that the protesters were not peaceful, as claimed, and instead were armed. Vinayak Prasad Yadav, then a member of the Samyukta Socialist Party, resigned from the Legislative Assembly of Bihar in protest of this killing at Kurtha.

== Legacy ==
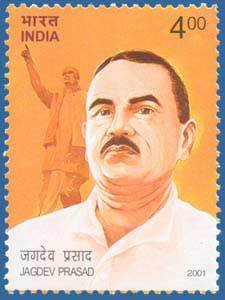
Jagdeo Prasad featured on Indian postage stamp (2001)

Prasad is considered as an icon of social justice politics by the regional political parties in state of Bihar. Many political parties of Bihar celebrates the anniversary of Prasad and there also exists a place in Patna named after him. In 2023, Rashtriya Janata Dal and Janata Dal (United), the ruling political parties of the state of Bihar then organised the celebration of anniversary of Prasad in Patna with the aim of mobilising the members of Kushwaha or the Koeri caste. While Rashtriya Janata Dal gave the responsibility to organise the celebration event to Alok Kumar Mehta, its ally Janata Dal United organised it separately. Another organisation called Mahatma Phule Samata Parishad, led by Upendra Kushwaha also organised it separately despite the opposition from the Janata Dal United leadership.

== See also ==
- Sumitra Devi
- Upendra Nath Verma
- Other Backward Class
