= Iswar Marandi =

Indian politician (1918–1972)

Member of Parliament, Lok Sabha
- In office 1962–1972
- Preceded by: Paika Murmu
- Succeeded by: Anthony Murmu
- Constituency: Rajmahal, Bihar

Personal details
- Born: 15 December 1918
- Died: 7 August 1972 (aged 53)
- Party: Indian National Congress

Iswar Marandi (15 December 1918 – 7 August 1972) was an Indian politician. He was elected to the Lok Sabha, lower house of the Parliament of India from Rajmahal, Bihar as a member of the Indian National Congress. Marandi died whilst in office, on 7 August 1972, at the age of 53.
