= Devidhan Besra =

Indian politician (c.1945–2022)

Member of Parliament, Lok Sabha
- In office 2009 -2014
- Preceded by: Hemlal Murmu
- Succeeded by: Vijay Hansda
- Constituency: Rajmahal, Jharkhand

Personal details
- Born: c. 1945 Jonka, Pakur district, Bengal Presidency, British India
- Died: 25 August 2022 (aged 77)
- Cause of death: Prostate cancer
- Party: Bhartiya Janta Party
- Spouse: Sumti Hansda
- Children: three sons and two daughters
- As of 8 March, 2014

Devidhan Besra (c. 1945 – 25 August 2022) was an Indian politician, belonging to Bharatiya Janata Party. In the 2009 election he was elected to the Lok Sabha from the Rajmahal Lok Sabha constituency of Jharkhand.

Besra died from prostate cancer on 25 August 2022, at the age of 77.

== Posts Held ==
#	From	To	Position
01	1980	1990	Member, Bihar Legislative Assembly (two terms)
02	2000	2005	Member, Jharkhand Legislative Assembly and Cabinet minister
03	2009	2014	Member of Parliament, 15th Lok Sabha

== See also ==
- Rajmahal (Lok Sabha constituency)
