= Vijay Kumar Hansdak =

Indian politician

Member of Parliament, Lok Sabha
- Incumbent
- Assumed office 16 May 2014
- Preceded by: Devidhan Besra
- Constituency: Rajmahal

Personal details
- Born: 27 October 1982 (age 43) Kalitalla, Barharwa, Jharkhand
- Party: Jharkhand Mukti Morcha
- Parent: Thomas Hansda (father)
- As of 15 December, 2016

Vijay Kumar Hansdak (Hindi pronunciation: [ʋɪd͡ʒəj kʊmaːɾ ɦə̃s.d̪ək]) is an Indian politician and a member of the Lok Sabha. He represents the Rajmahal constituency of Jharkhand and a member of the Jharkhand Mukti Morcha. Vijay is son of former Congress MP and former Congress State (Jharkhand) President Late Thomas Hansda from the same seat. Vijay joined the JMM fold just before the poll dates were announced.

== Notable works ==
Mr Hansdak along with Lobin Hembrom played a crucial role in establishing Shibu Soren Janjatiya Degree College, Borio, for the people residing the foot hills of the Rajmahal Hills, which has been dedicated to an eminent leader of Jharkhand Sri Shibu Soren. Currently, he is also the president of Shibu Soren Janjatiya Degree College, Borio.

== Positions held ==
Vijay Kumar Hansdak was elected to the 18th Lok Sabha in June 2024 and has been serving as a Member of the Committee on Coal, Mines, and Steel since September 26, 2024. He has also been a Member of the Joint Committee on Offices of Profit and the Standing Committee on Coal, Mines, and Steel since September 16, 2019. Additionally, he is a Member of the Consultative Committee for the Ministry of Home Affairs.

He was re-elected to the 17th Lok Sabha in May 2019 (second term) and served as a Member of the Library Committee and the Consultative Committee for the Ministry of Coal from March 12, 2015, to May 25, 2019. From October 7, 2014, to May 25, 2019, he was a Member of the Standing Committee on Rural Development. He was first elected to the 16th Lok Sabha in May 2014.

He also holds the position of Deputy Chairman, Forum for State Forest Conservation.
