= Anthony Murmu =

Indian politician

Member of Parliament, Lok Sabha
- In office 1977-1980
- Preceded by: Iswar Marandi
- Succeeded by: Seth Hembram
- Constituency: Rajmahal, Bihar

Personal details
- Born: 27 October 1930; Durgapur, Bengal Presidency, British India
- Died: 19 April 1985 (aged 54); Banjhi Village, Sahebganj district, Bihar, India (Now in Jharkhand)
- Political party: Janata Party
- Spouse: Bibiana

Anthony Murmu was an Indian politician. He was elected to the Lok Sabha from Rajmahal, Bihar as a member of the Janata Party. Murmu was a Jesuit priest. He struggled for rights of Santhal tribals.

Murmu was killed in a massacre in Banjhi 19 April 1985 along with 14 other Santhals.
