= Simon Marandi =

Indian politician (1947–2021)

Member of Parliament, Lok Sabha
- In office 1989–1996
- Preceded by: Seth Hembram
- Succeeded by: Thomas Hansda
- Constituency: Rajmahal

Personal details
- Born: 25 December 1947 Dumaria, Sahibganj district, Bihar (Now Jharkhand)
- Died: 13 April 2021 (aged 73) Rabindranath Tagore Hospital, Kolkata, West Bengal
- Party: Jharkhand Mukti Morcha
- Spouse: Sushila Hansda
- Children: Dinesh William Marandi Srishti Aslen Marandi
- Profession: Social Worker, Agriculturist, Sportsman, Industrialist and Management Consultant

Simon Marandi was an Indian politician. He was elected to the Lok Sabha, the lower house of the Parliament of India from Rajmahal as a member of the Jharkhand Mukti Morcha from 1989 to 1996.

== Political career ==
He was elected to Bihar Legislative Assembly in 1977 by defeating the then incumbent Marang Murmu by 149 votes from Litipara. He won Litipara in 1980 Bihar Legislative Assembly election, 1985 Bihar Legislative Assembly election, 2009 Jharkhand Legislative Assembly election at Litipara. He was Minister of Rural Development in first Hemant Soren ministry from 13 July 2013 to 28 December 2014. In 2014, he joined Bharatiya Janata Party and contested in Littipara but lost to Dr. Anil Murmu of Jharkhand Mukti Morcha but for 2017 by-election, Marandi returned to Jharkhand Mukti Morcha and won the seat. In 2019, Dinesh William Marandi contested the polls in 2019 Jharkhand Legislative Assembly election after Marandi sidelined himself due to ill health.

== Controversy ==
On 12 December 2017, the Bharatiya Janata Party called for Marandi's suspension from the Jharkhand Legislative Assembly for organizing a kissing contest for tribal couples in Pakur.

== Personal life ==
He married Sushila Hansda and had a daughter Srishti Aslen Marandi and son Dinesh William Marandi who won the 2019 Jharkhand Legislative Assembly election from Litipara.

In April 2021, he died of a cardiac ailment at Rabindranath Tagore Hospital, Kolkata, West Bengal at age of 73.
