= Hemlal Murmu =

Indian politician

Member of the Jharkhand Legislative Assembly
- Incumbent
- Assumed office 23 November 2024
- Preceded by: Dinesh William Marandi
- Constituency: Litipara
- In office 2009–2014
- Preceded by: Thomas Soren
- Succeeded by: Hemant Soren
- Constituency: Barhait
- In office 1990–2005
- Preceded by: Thomas Hansda
- Succeeded by: Thomas Soren
- Constituency: Barhait

Member of Parliament, Lok Sabha
- In office 16 May 2004 – 16 May 2009
- Preceded by: Thomas Hansda
- Succeeded by: Devidhan Besra
- Constituency: Rajmahal

Personal details
- Born: 22 August 1952 (age 73) Godda, Jharkhand
- Party: Jharkhand Mukti Morcha (since 2024)
- Other political affiliations: Bharatiya Janata Party (until 2024)
- Spouse: Meeru Soren
- Children: 2 sons and 2 daughters
- As of 25 September, 2006

Hemlal Murmu is a member of the 14th Lok Sabha of India. He represented the Rajmahal constituency of Jharkhand and was the Bharatiya Janata Party candidate from Rajmahal (Lok Sabha Constituency) in 2019. He left the party in 2023 and is currently a member of Jharkhand Mukti Morcha.

He is a member of the Jharkhand Legislative Assembly from 2024, representing Litipara as a Member of the Jharkhand Mukti Morcha.
