= Seth Hembram =

Indian politician

Member of Parliament, Lok Sabha
- In office 1980-1989
- Preceded by: Anthony Murmu
- Succeeded by: Simon Marandi
- Constituency: Rajmahal, Bihar

Personal details
- Party: Indian National Congress

Seth Hembram is an Indian politician. He was elected to the Lok Sabha, lower house of the Parliament of India from Rajmahal, Bihar as a member of the Indian National Congress.
