= Anant Kumar Ojha =

Indian politician

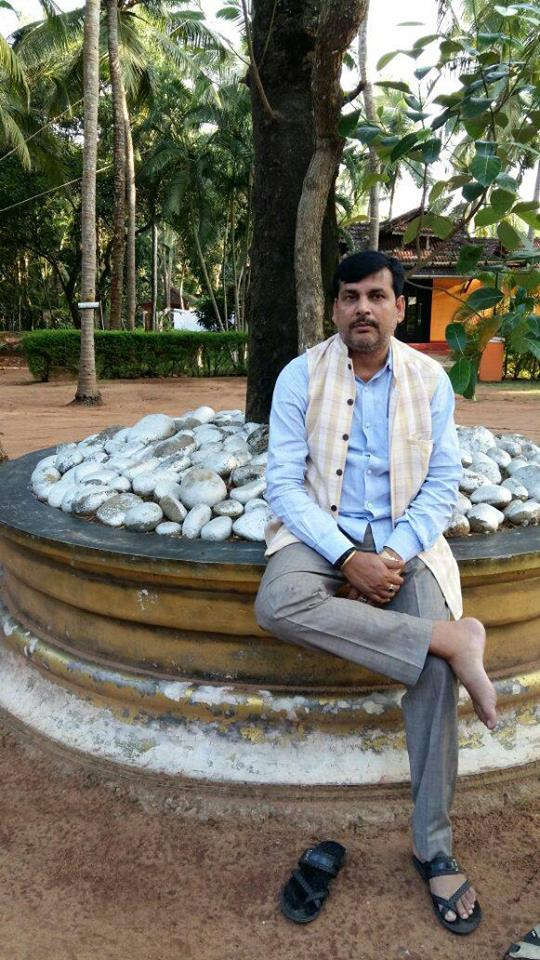
- Ojha in his constituency Sahebganj

Member of the Jharkhand Legislative Assembly
- In office 2014–2024
- Preceded by: Arun Mandal
- Succeeded by: Md. Tajuddin
- Constituency: Rajmahal

Anant Kumar Ojha is an Indian politician and former MLA from Rajmahal Vidhan Sabha constituency of Jharkhand after winning the seat in the 2014 Jharkhand Legislative Assembly elections securing over 77,000 votes. He is a member of the Bharatiya Janata Party. He completed his graduation from Graduate Arts Sahebganj College, Sahebganj S.K.M. University, Dumka in 1995. There's no criminal case registered against him.

Following the assembly election of 2014, Ojha was one of the candidates for the post of next Chief Minister. Ojha is a former president of BJYM (Bhartiya Janata Yuva Morcha). On 7 November, Ojha was appointed general secretary of the Jharkhand BJP. He is also a member of the Jharkhand Academic Council, working to develop Rajmahal as the tourist destination of the country.

== Major works ==
Ojha played a vital role in the inauguration of a bridge over Ganga in Sahebganj District. He has an opinion that once the port is developed, big vessels will arrive for Cargo transport from countries like Bangladesh, Thailand, Burma and Indonesia; at the same time, road & railway infrastructure would further help in carriage to all parts of India. According to him, citing old scriptures, Sahebganj district has served as a port in history when oil used to come from Burma to India and India in return used to export hot spices to other countries.
