= Som Marandi =

Indian politician (1964–2022)

Member of Parliament, Lok Sabha
- In office 10 March 1998 – 26 April 1999
- Preceded by: Thomas Hansda
- Succeeded by: Thomas Hansda
- Constituency: Rajmahal

Personal details
- Born: 7 January 1964 Litipara, Pakur district, Bihar (now in Jharkhand)
- Died: 23 March 2022 (aged 58) Ranchi, Jharkhand
- Party: Bharatiya Janata Party
- Spouse: Kapurmuli Tudu
- Children: Yogesh Marandi, Sneha Marandi, Shiwani Marandi, Savitri Marandi, Bhagwati Marandi, Sujata Marandi , Sumitra Marandi
- Parent: Dugru Marandi (father)
- Education: Bachelor of Arts
- Alma mater: Bhagalpur University
- Profession: Agriculturist, Politician

Som Marandi (7 January 1964 – 23 March 2022) was an Indian politician and member of the Bharatiya Janata Party. Marandi was a first term member of the Lok Sabha in 1998 from the Rajmahal Lok Sabha constituency in Jharkhand.
