= Md. Tajuddin =

Indian politician by rajmahal

Member of the Jharkhand Legislative Assembly
- Incumbent
- Assumed office 2024
- Preceded by: Anant Kumar Ojha
- Constituency: Rajmahal

Personal details
- Party: Jharkhand Mukti Morcha
- Profession: Politician

Md. Tajuddin is an Indian politician from Jharkhand. He is a member of the Jharkhand Legislative Assembly from 2024, representing Rajmahal Assembly constituency as a member of the Jharkhand Mukti Morcha.

== See also ==
- List of chief ministers of Jharkhand
- Jharkhand Legislative Assembly
