= Dinesh William Marandi =

Indian politician

Dinesh William Marandi (born 1985) is an Indian politician from Jharkhand. He is an MLA from Litipara Assembly constituency, which is reserved for Scheduled Tribe community, in Pakur district. He won the 2019 Jharkhand Legislative Assembly election, representing the Jharkhand Mukti Morcha.

== Early life and education ==
William is from Litipara, Pakur district, Jharkhand. He is the son of Simon Marandi. He completed his L.L.B. in 2013 at Nawada Law College which is affiliated with Magadh University.

== Career ==
William won from Litipara Assembly constituency representing the Jharkhand Mukti Morcha in 2019 Jharkhand Legislative Assembly election. He polled 66.675 votes and defeated his nearest rival, Daniel Kisku of the Bharatiya Janata Party by a margin of 13,903 votes.
