= Rabindranath Murmu =

Indian translator

- Born: 1967/68
- Occupation: Writer
- Relatives: Tala Tudu (sister)

Rabindranath Murmu is an Indian Santali language writer from Jharkhand. He won Sahitya Akademi Award for Santali Translation in 2012.

== Biography ==
Murmu is Tala Tudu's brother. He worked in Tata Steel.

Murmu translated Mahasweta Devi's novel Iter Upor It into Santali titled Ita Chetan Re Ita. For this work he was awarded Sahitya Akademi Translation Prize in 2012. He also translated Acharya Chatur Singh's Hindi book Sachhai Ki Karamaat Sarat Chandra Chattopadhyay’s Bengali book Boro Didi.
