= Arjak Sangh =

Organisation working for lower castes' freedoms

Arjak Sangh is an organisation, which was actively working for the emancipation of Dalits in the Indian state of Uttar Pradesh in the early 1970s. It is based on the idea of humanism and anti-Brahminism. Idol worship, fate, rebirth and soul are also some of the things they rally against. The Sangh was established in Lucknow by Ramswaroop Verma, the former Finance Minister under the Government of Uttar Pradesh, who was known for his work against Brahminism and for his championing the cause of Lower Castes. It was established in 1968 and from 1969 onwards its mouthpiece called Arjak Weekly came into being. It ran self-awareness drive amongst Dalit population in various belts of Uttar Pradesh and integrated the numerically powerful Chamar caste with itself. It also worked closely with other organizations, working in the sphere of Dalit emancipation. Through its publications like Achhoto Ki Samasya Aur Samadhan, Niradar Kaise Mite (transl: The conundrums of Untouchables and its solution, how to end the disrespect ?), it aimed to create a group of motivated Dalits, who could carry the movement forward.

== Arjak beliefs ==
The cover page of official mouthpiece of Arjak Sangh.

The Arjak Sangh opposes the philosophy of Brahminism and the cultural traditions followed by Dvija castes. The female members of the family are not allowed to visit the cremation site and also to participate in the Antyeshti of their dead ancestors, in contrast to it the followers of Arjak philosophy give equal freedom to the female members of their family to participate in last rituals to be followed after the death of their family members. The women of such families are also allowed to carry the dead family member to the cremation site on their shoulders, a practice reserved for only male relatives of the deceased in the orthodox Brahmanical religion. The Arjak philosophy is also opposed to the concept of Mrityu Bhoj (the food fest organised after the death, in the memory of deceased). The followers of Sangh believe that the ceremonies like Mrityu Bhoj are the way to "extract cash and kind" from the Jajman (doners), by the Brahmins, who usually officiate the last rituals for the contentment of the soul of the deceased. In the Dvija tradition or the Brahminism, the food fest is organised till the 13th day of the death (also called Terahwi), which causes financial burden for the family of deceased. However, Arjak Parampara (Arjak philosophy) opposes it.

The practices of the followers of Sangh bears close resemblance to the practices of Asur tribes, who inhabit Gumla region of Jharkhand. These tribes don't follow the custom of compulsory food ceremony after the death but organise a collective food ceremony with the help of other members of tribe, if only they think themselves capable of doing so. An intoxicating drink is also prepared for the occasion. In the recent times the followers of Arjak Parampara have also started promoting the use of electric crematoriums for laying off the bodies of their dead family members instead of common tradition of using wood to cremate, as followed by the Hindus.

Leaders of Arjak Sangh believe in total rejection of Ramayana, Mahabharata and Manusmriti. In fact Arjak Sangh workers have openly burned copies of Tulsi Ramayana to protest against its perceived "brahmin-supremacist" and "anti-constitutional" content.

The Arjak movement has it weaknesses though in the fact that few women are present in their meetings, although the men proclaim their wives are atheist too.

== See also ==
- Triveni Sangh
