= Ramswaroop Verma =

Political Thinker of India

- Ramswaroop Verma

former Minister of Finance in the Government of Uttar Pradesh

Personal details
- Born: 22 August 1923 Kanpur, Uttar Pradesh, India)
- Died: 19 August 1998 (aged 74) Lucknow, Uttar Pradesh, India
- Education: University of Allahabad
- Occupation: Philosopher; Writer; Political thinker

Ramswaroop Verma (22 August 1923 – 19 August 1998) was an Indian humanist. He was the founder of Arjak Sangh, a humanist organisation. The organisation emphasises social equality and is strongly opposed to Brahminism. Verma denied the existence of god and soul. He was strongly opposed to the doctrine of Karma and Fatalism. Verma campaigned tirelessly against Brahminism and Untouchability. According to him, Brahminism is rooted in the doctrine of rebirth and it is not possible to eradicate it without attacking the doctrine of rebirth. Verma strongly asserts that Brahminism cannot be reformed, and it has to be negated totally.

== Biography ==
Ramswaroop Verma was born on 22 August 1923 in Gaurikaran village of Kanpur district in the state of Uttar Pradesh, India. He was born into a Kurmi peasant family. Verma was married to Siyadulari as a student, but his wife died soon.

Ramswaroop Verma completed his M.A. in Hindi from Allahabad University in the year 1949, and Law Graduation from Agra University. In both the examinations he secured first position in the first class in the University. He qualified in the written examination of the Indian Administrative Services, but did not appear for the interview. Verma was of the view that an administrator has to work within limitations. His intention was to work for social change as a free citizen. He came in contact of prominent Indian democratic socialist leaders of his time such as Acharya Narendra Dev and Dr. Ram Manohar Lohia. Consequently, he performed a member of the Socialist Party. Several times he was elected to the Uttar Pradesh Legislative Assembly. In 1967, For some time his role was as the finance minister of Uttar Pradesh in the government headed by Charan Singh, who later acted the prime minister of India.

After being active in party politics for a long time, Verma concluded that political and economic equality could not be achieved without a social and cultural revolution. Consequently, he founded Arjak Sangh on 1 June 1968 for achieving this aim. He also started Arjak Saptahik, a Hindi weekly. He was the chief editor of the weekly. Verma was also influenced and inspired by B. R. Ambedkar. Verma was active in party politics for a long time. However, he is best known and remembered as a thinker, writer and the founder of Arjak Sangh. He kept working for Arjak Sangh throughout his life. He kept writing articles and books and delivered many lectures for promoting Humanism. Ramswaroop Verma wrote and spoke in Hindi only. He died in Lucknow on 19 August 1998.

== Ideology and works ==
Ramswaroop Verma has been described as a committed Ambedkarite. Like all other Bahujan intellectuals, he also nurtured a different perspective on the Brahmanical literatures and characters like Ramcharitmanas of Tulsidas and its lead character, Lord Rama. There necessarily exists two streams of thoughts on the characters like Rama and Krishna in the political circle. While one group of intellectual, the traditional elite, belonging to Dvija castes classify them as the ideal human beings, the Bahujan intellectuals consider them as purely mythical characters, crafted in order to keep the lower castes subjugated under the banner of religion. Several ideologues have composed their own version of texts on the literatures like Ramcharitmanas which identifies lord Rama as a negative character and the protector of hated Varna System. In his book Brahmin Mahima Kyo aur Kaise ?, Verma has described the Ramcharitmanas as a pro-upper caste text written by Brahmins in order to justify their superiority over the other caste groups. Verma had compiled this book from his letters written on various occasions to some of the notable politicians like then Prime Minister, Indira Gandhi and the contemporary Chief Minister of Uttar Pradesh, who according to him were acting against the secular feature of Indian constitution by organising commemoration ceremony of the day of compilation of various Hindu texts. Verma in his book, has described various verses of the text Ramcharitmanas, which justifies the superiority of the Brahmins vis a vis the other caste groups. The book also contains verses in which the castes like Kewat, Ahir and Kalwar are classified as "impure".

The Arjak Sangh, an organisation founded by Verma was also active in the obliteration of Brahminism and the emancipation of downtrodden Chamars in the several belts of Uttar Pradesh. It was supported by other organisations working in this field and Verma himself visited several places where the discrimination against the Dalits were recorded.

== Books by Ramswaroop Verma ==
- Manavwadi Prashnotri (Humanist Question-Answers), Lucknow: Arjak Sangh, 1984.
- Kranti Kyon aur Kaise (Revolution: Why and How?), Lucknow: Arjak Sangh, 1989.
- Manusmriti Rashtra ka Kalank (Manusmriti a National Shame), Lucknow: Arjak Sangh, 1990.
- Niradar kaise mite? (How to Remove Disrespect?) Lucknow: Arjak Sangh, 1993.
- Achuton ki Samasya aur Samadhan (The Question of Untouchables and its Solution) Lucknow: Arjak Sangh, 1984.

== See also ==
- Jagdeo Prasad
