= Tala Tudu =

Indian writer

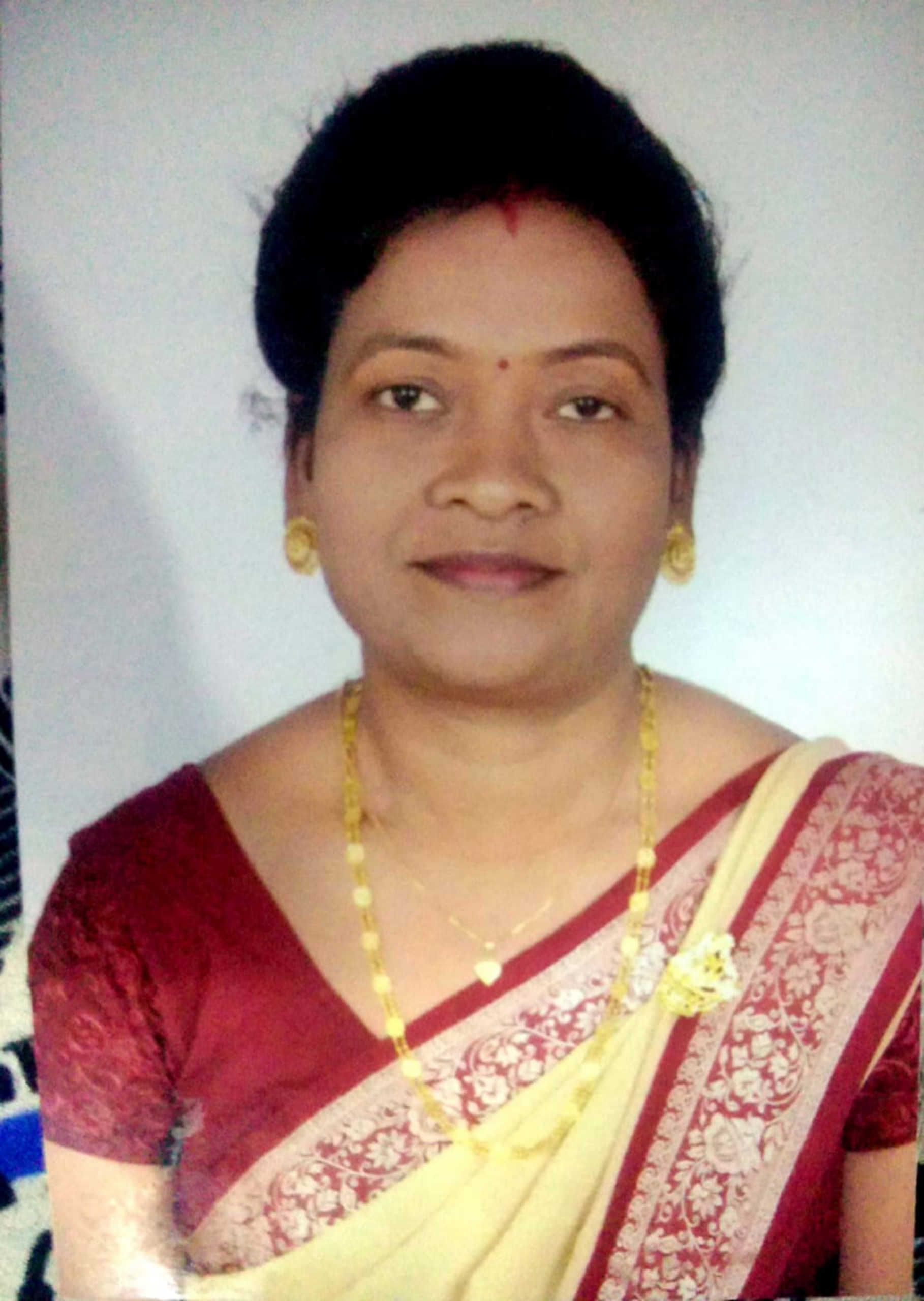
- Born: 1972 (age 53–54); Ranchi, Jharkhand, India
- Education: Lal Bahadur Shastri Memorial College
- Occupations: Writer, Nurse
- Relatives: Rabindranath Murmu (brother)

Tala Tudu is an Indian writer of Santali language and nurse from Jharkhand. She won Sahitya Akademi Award for Santali Translation in 2015. She was born in 1972.

== Biography ==
Tudu is Rabindranath Murmu's sister. She was a student of Lal Bahadur Shastri Memorial College.

Tudu translated Sarat Chandra Chattopadhyay's novel Parineeta into Santali titled Baplanij. It was her first translation. For this work she was awarded Sahitya Akademi Translation Prize in 2015.

Tudu is married to Ganesh Tudu, an advocate by profession. They have a daughter and a son. Their names are Anisha and Ashish.
