= Dhananjay Soren =

Indian politician

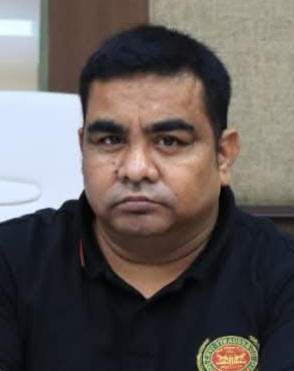

Member of the Jharkhand Legislative Assembly
- Incumbent
- Assumed office 23 November 2024
- Preceded by: Lobin Hembrom
- Constituency: Borio

Personal details
- Party: Jharkhand Mukti Morcha
- Profession: Politician

Dhananjay Soren is an Indian politician from Jharkhand. He is a member of the Jharkhand Legislative Assembly from 2024, representing Borio Assembly constituency as a member of the Jharkhand Mukti Morcha.

== See also ==
- List of chief ministers of Jharkhand
- Jharkhand Legislative Assembly
