= Lobin Hembrom =

Indian politician

Member of the Jharkhand Legislative Assembly
- In office 23 December 2019 – 23 November 2024
- Preceded by: Tala Marandi
- Succeeded by: Dhananjay Soren
- Constituency: Borio
- In office 23 December 2009 – 23 December 2014
- Preceded by: Tala Marandi
- Succeeded by: Tala Marandi
- Constituency: Borio
- In office 15 November 2000 – 27 February 2005
- Preceded by: Himself (As Bihar MLA)
- Succeeded by: Tala Marandi
- Constituency: Borio

Member of the Bihar Legislative Assembly
- In office 1990–2000
- Constituency: Borio

Personal details
- Born: Lobin Hembrom; 1952 (age 73–74) Mahagama, Jharkhand
- Citizenship: India
- Party: Bharatiya Janata Party (2024–present)
- Other political affiliations: Jharkhand Mukti Morcha (till 2024)
- Parent: Raghu Hembrom
- Education: Matriculated from Bihar School Examination Board Patna Bihar in 1970
- Occupation: Agriculture, Politician, Social worker

Lobin Hembrom is an Indian politician and member of the Bharatiya Janata Party. Hembrom was a three time member of the Jharkhand Legislative Assembly from the Borio constituency in Sahibganj district in 2000–2004, 2009–2013, and 2019–2023 on Jharkhand Mukti Morcha ticket.

Hembrom was suspended for contesting independently in the 2024 Indian general election, he subsequently joined Bharatiya Janata Party.

== Participation in Jharkhand Movement ==
Mr Lobin Hembrom (Hembrom also spelt as Hembram) started his political journey by being one of the leaders actively participating in Jharkhand Movement under the leadership of Disomguru Shibu Soren leader of Jharkhand Mukti Morcha demanding Jharkhand as separate state to be carved out from Bihar which was first demanded by Jaipal Singh Munda, a member of Constituent Assembly of Bihar and leader of Jharkhand Party.

== Notable works ==
Lobin Hembrom, being MLA of Borio Assembly, played a leading role in establishing Shibu Soren Janjatiya Degree College, Borio, for the people residing in the foothills of the Rajmahal Hills, which has been named after an eminent leader of Jharkhand Sri Shibu Soren whom he respects a lot.
