= Paika Murmu =

Indian politician

Member of Parliament, Lok Sabha
- In office 1957-1962
- Succeeded by: Iswar Marandi
- Constituency: Rajmahal, Bihar

Personal details
- Born: 15 January 1912
- Party: Indian National Congress
- Spouse: Lakhi Marandi

Paika Murmu was an Indian politician. He was elected to the Lok Sabha, lower house of the Parliament of India from Rajmahal, Bihar as a member of the Indian National Congress.
