= Thomas Hansda =

Indian politician

Member of Parliament, Lok Sabha
- In office 10 October 1999 — 22 May 2004
- Preceded by: Som Marandi
- Succeeded by: Hemlal Murmu
- In office 10 May 1996 — 4 December 1997
- Preceded by: Simon Marandi
- Succeeded by: Som Marandi
- Constituency: Rajmahal, Bihar

Personal details
- Died: 2010
- Party: Indian National Congress
- Spouse: Sarojini Shanti Murmu
- Children: Vijay Hansda and 2 daughters

Thomas Hansda was an Indian politician. He was elected to the Lok Sabha, lower house of the Parliament of India from Rajmahal, Bihar as a member of the Indian National Congress.
