= 1969 Bihar Legislative Assembly election =

Election in India

1969 Bihar legislative assembly election
- 9 February 1969

318 seats to the Bihar Legislative Assembly 160 seats needed for a majority
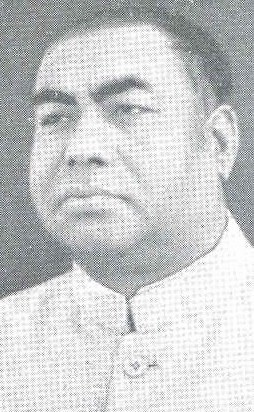

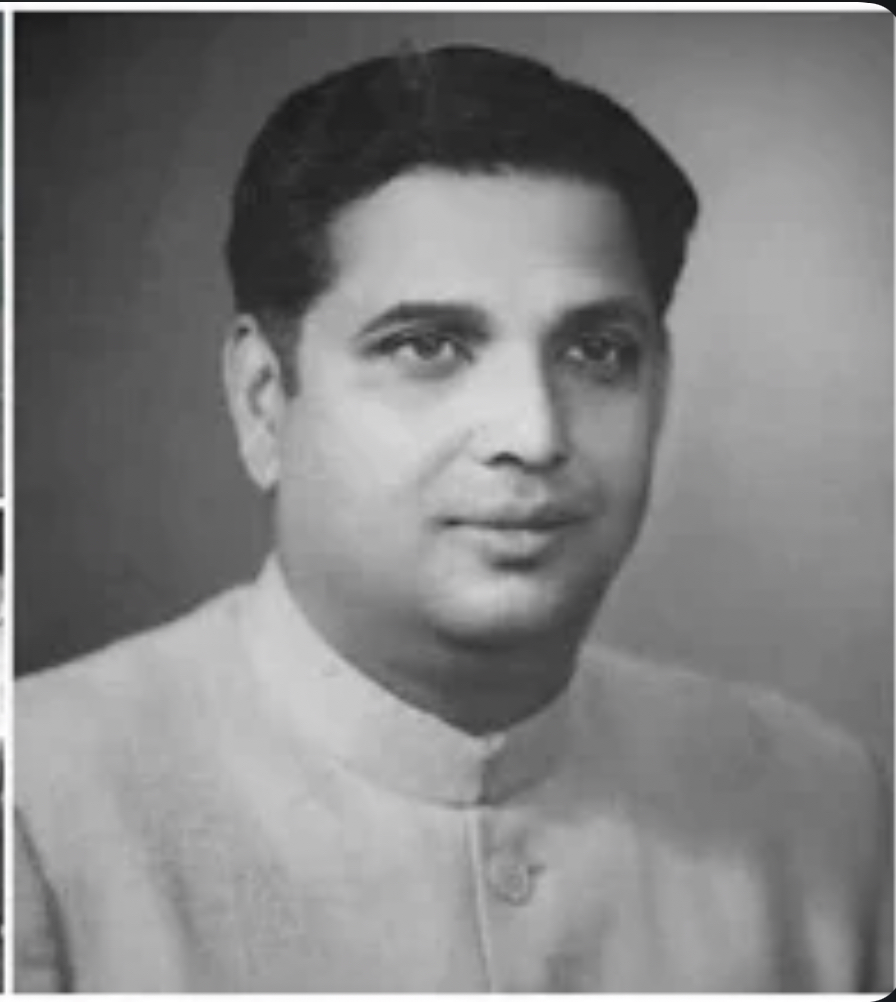

	Majority party	Minority party	Third party
Leader	Harihar Singh	B. P. Mandal
Party	INC(R)	SSP	ABJS
Seats won	118	52	34
Popular vote	4,570,413	2,052,274	2,345,780
Percentage	30.46%	13.68%	15.63%
	Fourth party	Fifth party
Party	CPI	PSP
Seats won	25	18
Popular vote	1,515,105	846,563
Percentage	10.10%	5.64%
CM before election
President's rule
N/A
Elected CM
Harihar Singh
INC(R)

An election was held in 1969 to elect members to the Bihar Legislative Assembly, the lower house of the legislature of the Indian state of Bihar. After the elections, the Congress emerged as the largest party, and Harihar Singh was sworn in as the Chief Minister of Bihar. Three parties contested in a 'Triple Alliance'; the Loktantrik Congress Dal, the Praja Socialist Party and the Samyukta Socialist Party. The Triple Alliance divided 295 out of 318 constituencies between them, assigning 23 seats to the Communist Party of India.

== Government formation ==
=== 1st Government ===
The Indian National Congress didn't win enough seats for an absolute majority and formed an alliance with 5 other parties, including the Janata Party, the Bharatiya Kranti Dal, the Bihar Prant Hul Jharkhand, the Shoshit Dal, the Swatantra Party and some Independents. However, it lost majority when Shoshit Dal withdrew support primarily on allegations on Janata Party head Kamakhya Narain Singh.

=== 2nd Government ===
Bhola Paswan shastri, the leader of the opposition in the Assembly, of Loktantrik Congress Dal became CM, with support of SSP, PSP, CPI, Jan sangh, Loktantrik congress Dal, Shoshit Dal. Ministry proved to be the shortestever government in Bihar. Nine days after Its Installation, the third SVD Ministry resigned following the withdrawal of support by the Jan sangh, which put forward the view that no defector, as a matter of principle, be appointed Minister.

=== 3rd Government ===
During President rule, in 1969, Congress split into Congress(O)- 50 MLAs and Congress(R) - 60 MLAs. Daroga Prasad Rai of Congress(R) became CM with support of PSP, CPI, Hul Jharkhand, Shoshit Dal and Bhartiya Kranti Dal. He constituted the Mungerilal commission, which later recommended OBC Reservation. His Ministry was dominated by the Backward castes. It fell after 10 months due to PSP and Shoshit Dal rebels.

=== 4th Government ===
The new SVD, which consisted of SSP, rebel PSP, Jan sangh, Congress (O), Janata party, BKD, swatantra party, factions of the jharkhand Party, Shoshit Dal and Hul jharkhand, formed government under Karpoori Thakur of SSP as CM for 6 months.

=== 5th Government ===
Bhola Paswan shastri once became CM, with support of Congress(R), shoshit Dal, Jharkhand party, PSP and CPI, but Congress(R) withdrew support by end of Dec 1971.

== Results ==
Party	Votes	%	Seats
Indian National Congress (R)	4,570,413	30.46	118
Bharatiya Jana Sangh	2,345,780	15.63	34
Samyukta Socialist Party	2,052,274	13.68	52
Communist Party of India	1,515,105	10.10	25
Praja Socialist Party	846,563	5.64	18
Loktantrik Congress Dal	573,344	3.82	9
Shoshit Dal	552,764	3.68	6
Janata Party	501,010	3.34	14
Bharatiya Kranti Dal	301,010	2.01	6
Communist Party of India (Marxist)	187,541	1.25	3
Swatantra Party	130,638	0.87	3
Bihar Prant Hul Jharkhand	56,506	0.38	5
Backward Classes Party of India	38,995	0.26	0
Proutist Bloc of India	29,675	0.20	0
Socialist Unity Centre of India	26,259	0.18	0
All India Forward Bloc	17,452	0.12	1
Revolutionary Socialist Party	6,310	0.04	0
Republican Party of India	5,057	0.03	0
Akhil Bharatiya Hindu Mahasabha	2,161	0.01	0
Bihar Prantiya Sudharavadi Party	855	0.01	0
Akhil Bharatiya Ram Rajya Parishad	811	0.01	0
Independents	1,243,106	8.29	24
Total	15,003,629	100.00	318
Valid votes	15,003,629	97.08	
Invalid/blank votes	451,530	2.92	
Total votes	15,455,159	100.00	
Registered voters/turnout	29,274,251	52.79	
Source: ECI

=== List of Chief ministers ===
Name	Term start	Term end	Term length	Party
Harihar Singh	26 February 1969	22 June 1969	116 days	Indian National Congress
Bhola Paswan Shastri	22 June 1969	4 July 1969	12 days	Loktantrik Congress
Vacant	4 July 1969	16 February 1970	227 days	N/A
Daroga Prasad Rai	16 February 1970	22 December 1970	309 days	Indian National Congress (R)
Karpoori Thakur	22 December 1970	2 June 1971	162 days	Samyukta Socialist Party
Bhola Paswan Shastri	2 June 1971	9 January 1972	221 days	Loktantrik Congress

== Elected members ==
#	Constituency	Reserved for (SC/ST/None)	Winner	Party
1	Dhanaha	None	Yogendra Pd. Shrivastava	Praja Socialist Party
2	Bagaha	SC	Narsingh Baitha	Indian National Congress
3	Ramnagar	None	Narayan Vikram Shah	Indian National Congress
4	Shikarpur	SC	Sita Ram Prasad	Bharatiya Jana Sangh
5	Sikta	None	Raiful Azam	Indian National Congress
6	Lauria	None	Shatru Mardan Sahi	Swatantra Party
7	Chanpatia	None	Vir Singh	Samyukta Socialist Party
8	Bettiah	None	Gauri Shanker Pande	Indian National Congress
9	Nautan	None	Kedar Pandey	Indian National Congress
10	Raxaul	None	Radha Pandey	Indian National Congress
11	Sugauli	None	Badari Narayan Jha	Indian National Congress
12	Motihari	None	Ram Sewak Prasad Jayaswal	Indian National Congress
13	Adapur	None	Premchand	Indian National Congress
14	Ghorasahan	None	Rajendra Pratap Sinha	Indian National Congress
15	Dhaka	None	Masodur Rahman	Indian National Congress
16	Patahi	None	Ram Nandan Singh	Indian National Congress
17	Madhuban	None	Mahendra Bharti	Communist Party of India
18	Kesaria	None	Mohammad Ezaj Hussain Khan	Indian National Congress
19	Pipra	SC	Bigu Ram	Indian National Congress
20	Harsidhi	None	Nageshwar Dutta Pathak	Indian National Congress
21	Gobindganj	None	Hari Shankar Sharma	Bharatiya Jana Sangh
22	Gopalganj	None	Ram Dulari Devi	Indian National Congress
23	Kuchaikot	None	Nagina Rai	Janata Party
24	Katea	SC	Nathuni Ram Chamar	Indian National Congress
25	Bhore	None	Raj Mangal Mishra	Indian National Congress
26	Mirganj	None	Anant Prasad Singh	Indian National Congress
27	Siwan	None	Janardan Tiwary	Bharatiya Jana Sangh
28	Ziradei	None	Zowar Hussain	Indian National Congress
29	Mairwa	SC	Ram Basawan Ram	Indian National Congress
30	Darauli	None	Lachuman Rawat	Samyukta Socialist Party
31	Raghunathpur	None	Ram Nandan Yadav	Indian National Congress
32	Maharajganj	None	Mahamaya Prasad Sinha	Bharatiya Kranti Dal
33	Barharia	None	Ram Raj Singh	Bharatiya Jana Sangh
34	Goreakothi	None	Krishna Kant Singh	Lok Tantrik Congress
35	Baikunthpur	None	Sheobachan Trivedi	Indian National Congress
36	Barauli	None	Bijul Singh	Communist Party of India
37	Manjhi	None	Rameshwar Dut Sharma	Indian National Congress
38	Baniapur	None	Ramanand Mishra	Samyukta Socialist Party
39	Masrakh	None	Kashi Nath Rai	Praja Socialist Party
40	Taraiya	None	Prabu Narain Singh	Janata Party
41	Marhaura	None	Bhishma Prasad Yadav	Indian National Congress
42	Jalalpur	None	Kumar Kalika Singh	Indian National Congress
43	Chapra	None	Janak Yadav	Praja Socialist Party
44	Garkha	SC	Jaglal Chaudhary	Indian National Congress
45	Parsa	None	Daroga Prasad Rai	Indian National Congress
46	Sonepur	None	Ram Jaipal Singh Yadav	Indian National Congress
47	Hajipur	None	Motilal Sinha Kanan	Shoshit Dal
48	Raghopur	None	Rambriksh Rai	Indian National Congress
49	Mahnar	None	Muneshwar Prasad Singh	Samyukta Socialist Party
50	Jandaha	None	Tulsi Das Mehta	Samyukta Socialist Party
51	Patepur	None	Paltan Ram	Samyukta Socialist Party
52	Goraul	None	Bachhan Sharma	Samyukta Socialist Party
53	Vaishali	None	Laliteshwar Prasad Shahi	Lok Tantrik Congress
54	Lalganj	None	Dipnarain Singh	Lok Tantrik Congress
55	Paru	None	Birendra Kumar Singh	Indian National Congress
56	Sahebganj	None	Yadunandan Singh	Independent
57	Baruraj	None	Ramchandra Pd. Shahi	Indian National Congress
58	Kanti	None	Harihar Prasad Shahi	Lok Tantrik Congress
59	Kurhani	None	Sadhu Sharan Shahi	Praja Socialist Party
60	Sakra	SC	Newa Lal Mahto	Samyukta Socialist Party
61	Muzaffarpur	None	Ramdeva Sharma	Communist Party of India
62	Bochaha	SC	Sitaram Rajak	Samyukta Socialist Party
63	Gaighatti	None	Nitishwar Prasad Sinha	Indian National Congress
64	Aurai	None	Pandav Rai	Samyukta Socialist Party
65	Minapur	None	Janak Singh	Indian National Congress
66	Runisaidpur	None	Bhuneshwar Rai	Samyukta Socialist Party
67	Sitamarhi	None	Shyam Sunder Das	Samyukta Socialist Party
68	Bathnaha	None	Ram Bahadur Singh	Indian National Congress
69	Belsand	None	Ramanand Singh	Praja Socialist Party
70	Sheohar	None	Thakur Girija Nandan Singh	Bharatiya Kranti Dal
71	Majorganj	SC	Ram Brikchh Ram	Samyukta Socialist Party
72	Sonbarsa	None	Raj Nandan Rai	Indian National Congress
73	Sursand	None	Ram Charitra Rai Yadav	Indian National Congress
74	Pupri	None	Ram Briksha Choudhary	Bharatiya Jana Sangh
75	Benipatti	None	Baidyanath Jha	Samyukta Socialist Party
76	Bisfi	None	Raj Kumar Purbey	Communist Party of India
77	Harlakhi	None	Shakoor Ahmed	Indian National Congress
78	Khajauli	None	Narmedeshwar Singh Azad	Praja Socialist Party
79	Jainagar	SC	Ramphal Paswan	Indian National Congress
80	Madhubani	None	Surya Narayan Singh	Praja Socialist Party
81	Jhanjharpur	None	Ram Phal Chaudhari	Samyukta Socialist Party
82	Rajnagar	SC	Bilat Paswan	Indian National Congress
83	Phulparas	None	Dhanik Lal Mandal	Samyukta Socialist Party
84	Laukaha	None	Prayag Lal Yadav	Communist Party of India
85	Madhepur	None	Radha Narayan Jha	Indian National Congress
86	Biraul	None	Mahabir Prasad	Shoshit Dal
87	Baheri	None	Tej Narayan Yadav	Swatantra Party
88	Manigachhi	None	Nagendra Jha	Indian National Congress
89	Benipur	None	Hari Nath Mishra	Lok Tantrik Congress
90	Darbhanga	None	Ram Vallash Jalan	Communist Party of India
91	Keotiranway	None	Hukumdeo Narayan Yadav	Samyukta Socialist Party
92	Jale	None	Tejnarayan Rout	Bharatiya Jana Sangh
93	Hayaghat	SC	Baleshwar Ram	Indian National Congress
94	Kalyanpur	None	Brahmdeo Narayain Singh	Samyukta Socialist Party
95	Warisnagar	SC	Ram Sewak Hazari	Samyukta Socialist Party
96	Samastipur	None	Rajendra Narain Sharma	Samyukta Socialist Party
97	Tajpur	None	Karpoori Thakur	Samyukta Socialist Party
98	Mohiuddinnagar	None	Kapildeo Narain Singh	Independent
99	Dalsinghsarai	None	Yaswant Kumar Choudhary	Swatantra Party
100	Sarairanjan	None	Ram Bilash Mishra	Samyukta Socialist Party
101	Bibhutpur	None	Ganga Prasad Srivastava	Samyukta Socialist Party
102	Rosera	None	Sahdeo Mahato	Indian National Congress
103	Hassanpur	None	Gajendra Prasad Himansu	Samyukta Socialist Party
104	Singhia	SC	Rameshwar Sahu	Indian National Congress
105	Raghopur	None	Baidya Nath Pd. Mehta	Indian National Congress
106	Kishanpur	None	Bhushan Pd. Gupta	Indian National Congress
107	Supaul	None	Uma Shanker Singh	Indian National Congress
108	Tribeniganj	None	Anup Lal Yadav	Samyukta Socialist Party
109	Chhatapur	SC	Kumbha Narayan Sardar	Samyukta Socialist Party
110	Kumarkhand	None	Ram Krishana Yadav	Indian National Congress
111	Simri Bakhtiarpur	None	Ramchandra Prasad	Samyukta Socialist Party
112	Mahishi	None	Lahtan Choudhary	Indian National Congress
113	Saharsa	None	Ramesh Jha	Indian National Congress
114	Sonbarsa	SC	Jageshwar Mazra	Samyukta Socialist Party
115	Madhipura	None	Bholi Pd. Mandal	Indian National Congress
116	Murlilganj	None	Kamleshwari Prasad Yadav	Indian National Congress
117	Alamnagar	None	Vidyakar Kavi	Indian National Congress
118	Rupauli	None	Anandi Prasad Singh	Indian National Congress
119	Dhamdaha	None	Kalika Prasad Singh	Samyukta Socialist Party
120	Banmankhi	SC	Rasik Lal Rismideo	Indian National Congress
121	Kasba	None	Ram Narayan Nandal	Indian National Congress
122	Raniganj	SC	Dumar Lal Baitha	Indian National Congress
123	Narpatganj	None	Satya Narayan Yadav	Indian National Congress
124	Forbesganj	None	Saryu Mishra	Indian National Congress
125	Araria	None	Sital Prasad Gupta	Indian National Congress
126	Palasi	None	Mohammad Azimuddin	Independent
127	Bahadurganj	None	Najmuddin	Indian National Congress
128	Thakurganj	None	Mohammad Hussain Azad	Indian National Congress
129	Kishanganj	None	Rafique Alam	Indian National Congress
130	Jokihat	None	Taslim Uddin	Indian National Congress
131	Amour	None	Haseebur Rahman	Praja Socialist Party
132	Purnea	None	Kamaldeo Narain Sinha	Indian National Congress
133	Katihar	None	Satya Narain Biswas	Lok Tantrik Congress
134	Barsoi	None	Sohan Lal Jain	Independent
135	Azamnagar	None	Abu Zafar	Indian National Congress
136	Korha	SC	Bhola Paswan Shashtri	Lok Tantrik Congress
137	Barari	None	Sakur	Communist Party of India
138	Manihari	None	Yuvraj	Praja Socialist Party
139	Rajmahal	None	Om Prakash Roy	Bharatiya Jana Sangh
140	Borio	ST	Seth Hembrom	Bihar Prant Hul Jharkhand
141	Barhait	ST	Masih Soren	Bihar Prant Hul Jharkhand
142	Litipara	ST	Som Murmu	Bihar Prant Hul Jharkhand
143	Pakpura	None	Syed Md. Jafar Ali	Indian National Congress
144	Maheshpur	ST	Kaleshwar Hemram	Bihar Prant Hul Jharkhand
145	Shikaripara	ST	Chadra Murmu	Independent
146	Nala	None	Viseshwar Khan	Communist Party of India
147	Jamtara	None	Kali Prasad Singh	Indian National Congress
148	Sarath	None	Kamdeo Prasad Singh	Praja Socialist Party
149	Madhupur	None	Bhageshwar Prasad Moul	Indian National Congress
150	Deoghar	SC	Baidyanath Das	Indian National Congress
151	Jarmundi	None	Srikant Jha	Indian National Congress
152	Dumka	ST	Paika Murmu	Indian National Congress
153	Jama	ST	Madan Besra	Indian National Congress
154	Poraiyahat	ST	Edward Marandi	Bihar Prant Hul Jharkhand
155	Godda	None	Memant Kumar Jha	Samyukta Socialist Party
156	Mahagama	None	Sayeed Ahmad	Communist Party of India
157	Pirpainti	None	Ambika Prasad	Communist Party of India
158	Colgong	None	Sadanand Singh	Indian National Congress
159	Nathnagar	None	Chunchun Prasad Yadav	Bharatiya Jana Sangh
160	Bhagalpur	None	Vijoy Kumar Mitra	Bharatiya Jana Sangh
161	Gopalpur	None	Madan Prasad Singh	Indian National Congress
162	Bihpur	None	Prabhu Narayan Roy	Communist Party of India
163	Sultanganj	None	Ram Raksha Prasad Yadav	Indian National Congress
164	Amarpur	None	Sukhnarain Singh	Samyukta Socialist Party
165	Dhuraiya	SC	Ram Chanura Bhanu	Independent
166	Banka	None	Thakur Kamakhya Pd. Singh	Indian National Congress
167	Belhar	None	Chaturbhuj Prasad Singh	Samyukta Socialist Party
168	Sultanganj	None	Suresh Prasad Yadav	Indian National Congress
169	Chakai	None	Shrikrishna Singh	Samyukta Socialist Party
170	Jhajha	None	Chandrashekhar Singh	Indian National Congress
171	Jamui	None	Tripurari Prasad Singh	Praja Socialist Party
172	Sikandra	SC	Rameshwar Paswan	Indian National Congress
173	Sheikhpura	SC	Loknath Mochi	Communist Party of India
174	Barbigha	None	Shiv Shankar Singh	Independent
175	Barahiya	None	Sidheshwar Singh	Indian National Congress
176	Surajgarha	None	Sunaina Devi	Communist Party of India
177	Jamalpur	None	Ram Balak Singh	Communist Party of India
178	Tarapur	None	Tarni Prasad Singh	Shoshit Dal
179	Kharagpur	None	Samser Jang Bahadur Singh	Samyukta Socialist Party
180	Monghyr	None	Ravish Chandra Verma	Bharatiya Jana Sangh
181	Parbatta	None	Jagdamb Prasad Mandal	Indian National Congress
182	Chautham	None	Jagdambi Mandal	Samyukta Socialist Party
183	Alauli	SC	Ram Bilas Paswan	Samyukta Socialist Party
184	Khagaria	None	Ram Bahadur Azad	Samyukta Socialist Party
185	Balia	None	Jamaluddin	Indian National Congress
186	Begusarai	None	Saryu Prasad Singh	Indian National Congress
187	Bakhri	SC	Yugal Kishore Sharma	Communist Party of India
188	Bariarpur	None	Ram Jeewan Singh	Samyukta Socialist Party
189	Barauni	None	Chandra Shekhar Singh	Communist Party of India
190	Bachhwara	None	Bhuveneshwar Rai	Indian National Congress
191	Mokameh	None	Kameshwar Pd. Singh	Indian National Congress
192	Barh	None	Rana Shedlakhpati Singh	Indian National Congress
193	Bakhtiarpur	None	Dharambir Singh	Indian National Congress
194	Fatwa	SC	Kauleshwar Das	Indian National Congress
195	Bihar	None	Vijoy Kumar Yadav	Communist Party of India
196	Asthawan	None	Nand Kishore Prasad Singh	Janata Party
197	Ekangar Sarai	None	Lal Singh Tyagi	Indian National Congress
198	Rajgir	SC	Yadunandan Prasad	Bharatiya Jana Sangh
199	Islampur	None	Ramsaran Prasad Singh	Praja Socialist Party
200	Chandi	None	Ram Raj Prasad Singh	Indian National Congress
201	Hilsa	None	Jigdish Prasad	Bharatiya Jana Sangh
202	Masaurhi	None	Ram Devan Das	Bharatiya Jana Sangh
203	Punpun	SC	Munshi Choudhary	Samyukta Socialist Party
204	Patna South	None	Ram Nandan Singh	Indian National Congress
205	Patna East	None	Ramdeo Mahto	Bharatiya Jana Sangh
206	Patna West	None	A . K . Sen	Communist Party of India
207	Danapur	None	Budh Deo Singh	Indian National Congress
208	Maner	None	Mahabir Gop	Indian National Congress
209	Bikram	None	Khaderan Singh	Bharatiya Kranti Dal
210	Paliganj	None	Chandradeo Pd. Verma	Samyukta Socialist Party
211	Sandesh	None	Ramji Prasad Singh	Bharatiya Jana Sangh
212	Arrah	None	Ram Awdhesh Singh	Samyukta Socialist Party
213	Barhara	None	Mahanth Mahadeva Nand Giri	Independent
214	Shahpur	None	Rama Nand Tiwari	Samyukta Socialist Party
215	Brahampur	None	Suryanarain Sharma	Lok Tantrik Congress
216	Nayagram	ST	Harihar Prasad Singh	Indian National Congress
217	Nawanagar	SC	Lal Behari Prasad	Communist Party of India
218	Buxar	None	Jagnarain Trivedi	Indian National Congress
219	Ramgarh	None	Viswanath Rai	Indian National Congress
220	Mohania	SC	Bhagwat Prasad	Praja Socialist Party
221	Chainpur	None	Badri Singh	Praja Socialist Party
222	Bhabua	None	Chandramauli Mishra	Bharatiya Jana Sangh
223	Chenari	SC	Chhathu Ram	Indian National Congress
224	Sasaram	None	Bipin Behari Singh	Praja Socialist Party
225	Dehri	None	Riyasat Karim	Indian National Congress
226	Karakat	None	Tulsi Singh Yadav	Samyukta Socialist Party
227	Nokha	None	Jagdish Ojha	Janata Party
228	Dinara	None	Ramanand Prasad Singh	Indian National Congress
229	Bikramganj	None	Sant Prasad Singh	Communist Party of India
230	Jagdishpur	None	Satya Narayan Singh	Independent
231	Piro	None	Ram Ekbal Singh	Samyukta Socialist Party
232	Sahar	SC	Rajdeo Ram	Praja Socialist Party
233	Arwal	None	Shah Zohair	Communist Party of India
234	Kurtha	None	Jagdeo Prasad	Shoshit Dal
235	Makhdumpur	SC	Mahabir Choudhary	Indian National Congress
236	Jehanabad	None	Hari Lal Pd. Sinha	Shoshit Dal
237	Ghosi	None	Kaushlendra Pd. N . Singh	Indian National Congress
238	Belaganj	None	Mithleshwar Prasad Singh	Indian National Congress
239	Goh	None	Awadh Singh	Samyukta Socialist Party
240	Daudnagar	None	Ram Vilas Singh	Samyukta Socialist Party
241	Obra	None	Shri Padarath Singh	Praja Socialist Party
242	Nabinagar	None	Mahabir Prasad `akela`	Communist Party of India
243	Aurangabad	None	Saryoo Singh	Praja Socialist Party
244	Rafiganj	SC	Sahdeo Chaudhry	Bharatiya Jana Sangh
245	Imamganj	SC	Ishwar Das	Samyukta Socialist Party
246	Sherghati	None	Jai Ram Giri	Independent
247	Barachatti	SC	Bhagawati Devi	Samyukta Socialist Party
248	Bodh Gaya	SC	Kali Ram	Bharatiya Jana Sangh
249	Konch	None	Ram Balav Saran Singh	Independent
250	Gaya	None	Gopal Mishra	Bharatiya Jana Sangh
251	Gaya Muffasil	None	Hardeo Narain Singh	Indian National Congress
252	Atri	None	Babu Lal Singh	Bharatiya Jana Sangh
253	Hisua	None	Shatrughan Sharan Singh	Indian National Congress
254	Nawada	None	Gauri Shankar Keshri	Bharatiya Jana Sangh
255	Rajauli	SC	Babu Lal	Bharatiya Jana Sangh
256	Warsaliganj	None	Deo Nandan Prasad	Communist Party of India
257	Gobindpur	None	Yugal Kishore Singh Yadav	Lok Tantrik Congress
258	Kodarama	None	Vishwa Nath Modi	Samyukta Socialist Party
259	Dhanwar	None	Punit Roy	Indian National Congress
260	Gawan	SC	Taneshwar Azad	Samyukta Socialist Party
261	Jamua	None	Sadanand Prasad	Indian National Congress
262	Giridih	None	Chaturanan Mishra	Communist Party of India
263	Dumri	None	Kailashpati Singh	Janata Party
264	Bermo	None	Bindeshwari Dubey	Indian National Congress
265	Bagodar	None	Basant Narain Singh	Janata Party
266	Barhi	None	Indra Jitendra N . Singh	Janata Party
267	Hazaribagh	None	Raghunandan Prasad	Janata Party
268	Chauparan	None	Nirajan Prasad Singh	Janata Party
269	Chatra	None	Kamakshya Narayan Singh	Janata Party
270	Barkagaon	SC	Mahesh Ram	Janata Party
271	Ramgarh	None	Bodulal Agrawal	Indian National Congress
272	Mandu	None	Kamkshya Narain Singh	Janata Party
273	Jaridih	None	Shashank Manjri	Janata Party
274	Chandankiyari	SC	Durga Charan Das	Bharatiya Kranti Dal
275	Topchanchi	None	Purnendu Narain Singh	Janata Party
276	Baghmara	None	Imamul Hal Khan	Samyukta Socialist Party
277	Dhanbad	None	Raghubans Singh	Bharatiya Kranti Dal
278	Tundi	None	Satyanarain Dudani	Bharatiya Jana Sangh
279	Nirsa	None	Nirmalendu Bhattacharya	Communist Party of India
280	Sindri	None	A . K . Roy	Communist Party of India
281	Jharia	None	S . K . Rai	Bharatiya Kranti Dal
282	Baharagora	None	Shibu Ranjan Khan	Independent
283	Ghatsila	ST	Yadunath Baskey	Independent
284	Patamda	None	Ghansyam Mahato	Indian National Congress
285	Jamshedpur East	None	Kedar Das	Communist Party of India
286	Jamshedpur West	None	Sunil Mukherjee	Communist Party of India
287	Jugsalai	ST	Sanatan Manjhi	Independent
288	Saraikella	None	Banbihari Manto	Independent
289	Chaibassa	ST	Bagun Sumbrui	Independent
290	Majhgaon	ST	Purna Chandra Birua	Independent
291	Manoharpur	ST	Ratnakar Nayak	Independent
292	Jaganathpur	ST	Mangal Singh Lamai	Independent
293	Chakradharpur	ST	Maricharan Soy	Independent
294	Ichagarh	None	Ghanshyam Mahto	All India Forward Bloc
295	Kharsawan	ST	Chandra Mohan Manjhi	Independent
296	Tamar	ST	Anirudh Patar	Bharatiya Jana Sangh
297	Torpa	ST	Niral Enem Horo	Independent
298	Khunti	ST	Tiru Muchi Rai Munda	Indian National Congress
299	Silli	SC	Brindawan Swansi	Shoshit Dal
300	Khijri	ST	Sukhari Oraon	Bharatiya Jana Sangh
301	Ranchi	None	Nani Gopal Mitra	Bharatiya Jana Sangh
302	Kanke	None	Ramtahal Chaudhary	Bharatiya Jana Sangh
303	Kolebira	ST	S . K . Bage	Independent
304	Simdega	ST	Gajadhar Gond	Bharatiya Jana Sangh
305	Chainpur	ST	Jairam Uraon	Independent
306	Gumla	ST	Ropna Uraon	Bharatiya Jana Sangh
307	Sisai	ST	Lalit Uraon	Bharatiya Jana Sangh
308	Bero	ST	Karamchand Bhagat	Indian National Congress
309	Mandar	ST	Shri Krishna Bhagat	Indian National Congress
310	Lohardaga	ST	Vihari Lakra	Indian National Congress
311	Latehar	ST	Jamuna Singh	Bharatiya Jana Sangh
312	Panki	SC	Ramdeo Ram	Bharatiya Jana Sangh
313	Daltonganj	None	Puran Chand	Samyukta Socialist Party
314	Garhwa	None	Gopi Nath Singh	Bharatiya Jana Sangh
315	Bhawanathpur	None	Hemendra Pratap	Samyukta Socialist Party
316	Leslieganj	None	Jag Narain Pathak	Indian National Congress
317	Bishrampur	SC	Jageshwar Ram	Bharatiya Jana Sangh
318	Hussainabad	None	Bhisma Narayan Singh	Indian National Congress
