= Bihar Prant Hul Jharkhand =

Former political party in Bihar, India

The Bihar Prant Hul Jharkhand was a Jharkhandi political party in the Indian state of Bihar. The party emerged from a split in the Jharkhand Party and was founded on 28 December 1968. The party was based among non-Christian Adivasis in the Santhal Parganas. The party was named after the 1855 Santhal rebellion, commonly known as 'Hul'.

The party contested the 1969 Bihar Legislative Assembly election, fielding 14 candidates whom together mustered 56,506 votes (0.38% of all votes cast in the state). 5 candidates of the party were elected to the Bihar Legislative Assembly.

In 1972 the party was divided into two - the Progressive Hul Jharkhand Party and the Rajya Hul Jharkhand Party.
