= Bahalda Assembly constituency =

Former constituency of the Odisha Legislative Assembly

Bahalda
- Former constituency for the Odisha Legislative Assembly

Constituency details
- Country: India
- Region: East India
- State: Odisha
- District: Mayurbhanj
- Lok Sabha constituency: Mayurbhanj
- Established: 1951
- Abolished: 2008
- Total electors: 1,27,993 (Note: as on 2004)
- Reservation: ST

Bahalda was an Assembly constituency from Mayurbhanj district of Odisha. It was established in 1951 and abolished in 2008. It was subsumed by the Rairangpur Assembly constituency. This constituency was reserved for Schedule Tribes.

== Historical Extent ==
- 1973: Tiring and Bahalda police stations and Badmouda and Guhaldangiri grama panchayats in Gorumohisani police station in Bamanghaty subdivision.
- 1965: Bahalda and Tiring police stations in Bamanghaty subdivision.
- 1956: Bahalda and Tiring police stations in Bamanghaty sub-division.
- 1951: Bahalda police station of Bamanghati sub-division.

== Elected members ==
Vote share of Winning candidates
2004	25.10%
2000	32.47%
1995	30.39%
1990	42.22%
1985	62.34%
1980	35.89%
1977	59.19%
1974	23.79%
1971	38.22%
1967	52.74%
1961	53.04%
1957	45.41%
1951	69.78%

Between 1951 & 2008, 13 elections were held till date.

List of members elected from Bahalda constituency are:

Year	Member	Party
1951	Sonaram Soren	Indian National Congress
1957	Surendramohan Hembram	Independent
1961	Sunaram Soren	Indian National Congress
1967	Sunaram Soren	Orissa Jana Congress
1971	Sashibhusan Marandi	Jharkhand Party
1974	Sashibhusan Marandi	Independent
1977	Sunaram Soren	Janata Party
1980	Ramchandra Hansdah	Indian National Congress (I)
1985	Bhagey Gobardhan	Janata Party
1990	Khelaram Mahali	Independent
1995	Khelaram Mahali	Jharkhand People's Party
2000	Laxman Soren	Bharatiya Janata Party
2004	Prahallad Purti	Jharkhand Mukti Morcha

== Election results ==
=== 2004 ===
2004 Odisha Legislative Assembly election: Bahalda
Party	Candidate	Votes	%	±%
JMM	Prahlad Purty	20,041	25.10%	
BJP	Khelaram Mahali	19,210		
INC	Laxman Soren	12,948		
Independent	Helena Bage	12,796		
Independent	Lopamudra Hansdah	7,332		
Independent	Mohan Hansdah	2,827		
JDP	Singray Hansdah	1,489		
AJSU	Budhan Murmu	1,470		
Independent	Sashibhushan Marandi	931		
Independent	Chhatray Hansdah	779		
Total valid votes		79,820		
Rejected ballots		8		
Turnout		79,828		
Registered electors		1,27,993		▲
Margin of victory		825	1.03%	▼
JMM gain from BJP				

=== 2000 ===
2000 Odisha Legislative Assembly election: Bahalda
Party	Candidate	Votes	%	±%
BJP	Laxman Soren	23,305	32.47%	▲29.6
INC	Saiba Sushil Kumar Hansdah	21,245	29.60%	▲7.11
Independent	Khelaram Majhi	9,750	13.58%	New
JMM	Ramachandra Hembrom	11,519	16.05%	▲13.1
Independent	Amar Singh Tudu	2,752	3.83%	New
AITC	Prahlad Purty	2,641	3.68%	New
BSP	Somnath Pingua	2,641	0.78%	New
Total valid votes		71,772		
Rejected ballots		1,541		
Turnout		73,313	59.64%	▼2.73
Registered electors		1,22,779		▲
Margin of victory		2,060	2.87%	▲1.21
BJP gain from JPP				

=== 1995 ===
In the 1995 State election to the Legislative Assembly of Orissa, Bahalda had 22 candidates, holding the record for the highest number of contestants in a constituency for this election.

1995 Odisha Legislative Assembly election: Bahalda
Party	Candidate	Votes	%	±%
JPP	Khelaram Mahali	21,564	30.39%	New
JD	Surendra Nath Naik	20,389	28.74%	▼10.3
INC	Birsa Kandankel	15,959	22.49%	▲8.75
JMM	Chhatrai Hansdah	2,092	2.95%	New
BJP	Ramrai Majhi	2,029	2.86%	New
Independent	Prahallad Purty	1,678	2.36%	New
Independent	Bagun Singh	1,165	1.64%	New
Jharkhand Party	Fagu Baskey	1,072	1.51%	New
Independent	Sunil Munda	935	1.32%	New
Independent	Purnima Munda	863	1.22%	New
Independent	Ramchandra Hansdah	800	1.13%	New
Independent	Dulalal Mahali	418	0.59%	New
Independent	Thakurdas Soren	321	0.45%	New
Independent	Gulia Hembram	281	0.40%	▲0.06
Independent	Laxman Singh Purty	267	0.38%	New
Independent	Gobinda Soren	212	0.30%	New
Independent	Ghasiram Marandi	210	0.30%	New
Independent	Ananta Tudu	192	0.27%	New
Independent	Sudarshan Soy	180	0.25%	New
Independent	Bikramaditya Tudu	153	0.22%	New
Independent	Kanhu Soren	113	0.16%	New
Independent	Jitrai Hembram	61	0.09%	New
Total valid votes		70,954		
Rejected ballots		2,784		
Turnout		73,738	62.37%	▲17.8
Registered electors		1,18,224		▲
Margin of victory		1,175	1.66%	▼1.44
JPP gain from Independent				

=== 1990 ===
1990 Odisha Legislative Assembly election: Bahalda
Party	Candidate	Votes	%	±%
Independent	Khelaram Mahali	20,073	42.22%	New
JD	Nirmal Baghey	18,597	39.11%	New
INC	Hindurai Soren	6,534	13.74%	▼12.3
Jharkhand Dal	Maino Murmu	735	1.55%	▲0.02
Independent	Aswani Baipai	563	1.18%	New
Independent	Gansa Soren	423	0.89%	New
Independent	Chhatrai Hansdah	387	0.81%	New
Independent	Gulia Hembram	162	0.34%	New
Independent	Sundarmohan Hemram	71	0.15%	New
Total valid votes		47,545		
Rejected ballots		1,408		
Turnout		48,953	44.54%	▲6.63
Registered electors		1,09,908		▲
Margin of victory		1,476	3.10%	▼33.1
Independent gain from JP				

=== 1985 ===
1985 Odisha Legislative Assembly election: Bahalda
Party	Candidate	Votes	%	±%
JP	Baghey Gobardhan	19,821	62.34%	New
INC	Laxmi Majhi	8,296	26.09%	New
Independent	Madhusudan Soren	2,649	8.33%	New
BJP	Gobinda Chandra Murmu	545	1.71%	New
Jharkhand Dal	Gopinath Marnoy	486	1.53%	▼6.6
Total valid votes		31,797		
Rejected ballots		996		
Turnout		32,793	37.91%	▲10.6
Registered electors		86,509		▲
Margin of victory		11,525	36.25%	▲25.7
JP gain from INC(I)				

=== 1980 ===
1980 Odisha Legislative Assembly election: Bahalda
Party	Candidate	Votes	%	±%
INC(I)	Rama Chandra Hansdah	7,691	35.89%	New
Independent	Laxman Majhi	5,450	25.43%	New
INC(U)	Guru Charan Bage	5,162	24.09%	New
Jharkhand Dal	Sashi Bhushan Marandi	1,742	8.13%	New
Independent	Gokul Dandapat	1,384	6.46%	New
Total valid votes		21,429		
Rejected ballots		776		
Turnout		22,205	27.31%	▲2.16
Registered electors		81,315		▲
Margin of victory		2,241	10.46%	▼20.4
INC(I) gain from JP				

=== 1977 ===
1977 Odisha Legislative Assembly election: Bahalda
Party	Candidate	Votes	%	±%
JP	Sunaram Soren	11,321	59.19%	New
Jharkhand Party	Sashibhusan Marndi	5,413	28.30%	New
INC	Kartik Chandra Majhi	2,394	12.52%	▼10.5
Total valid votes		19,128		
Rejected ballots		604		
Turnout		19,732	25.15%	▼10.4
Registered electors		78,444		▲
Margin of victory		5,908	30.89%	▲30.1
JP gain from Independent				

=== 1974 ===
1974 Odisha Legislative Assembly election: Bahalda
Party	Candidate	Votes	%	±%
Independent	Sashi Bhusan Marndi	5,936	23.79%	New
INC	Ram Chandra Hansdah	5,752	23.05%	▲4.73
Jharkhand Dal	Sunaram Soren	4,980	19.96%	New
SWA	Faguram Murmu	4,181	16.75%	▲2.24
Independent	Ram Chandra Majhi	2,402	9.63%	New
Independent	Guru Charan Bage	1,703	6.82%	New
Total valid votes		24,954		
Rejected ballots		1,961		
Turnout		26,915	35.55%	▲0.55
Registered electors		75,715		▲
Margin of victory		184	0.74%	▼19.1
Independent gain from Jharkhand Party				

=== 1971 ===
1971 Odisha Legislative Assembly election: Bahalda
Party	Candidate	Votes	%	±%
Jharkhand Party	Sashi Bhusan Marndi	8,454	38.22%	New
INC	Ram Chandra Hansdah	4,053	18.32%	▼5.15
Utkal Congress	Guru Charan Bage	3,811	17.23%	New
SWA	Gopinath Marndi	3,209	14.51%	New
Independent	Sundar Mohan Hemram	1,561	7.06%	▼16.7
Jana Congress	Sishupada Hemram	1,030	4.66%	▼48.0
Total valid votes		22,118		
Rejected ballots		1,526		
Turnout		23,644	35.00%	▼1.69
Registered electors		67,550		▲
Margin of victory		4,401	19.90%	▼9.06
Jharkhand Party gain from Jana Congress				

=== 1967 ===
1967 Odisha Legislative Assembly election: Bahalda
Party	Candidate	Votes	%	±%
Jana Congress	S. Soren	10,947	52.74%	New
Independent	S. Hemram	4,936	23.78%	New
INC	R. C. Majhi	4,872	23.47%	▼29.5
Total valid votes		20,755		
Rejected ballots		2,799		
Turnout		23,554	36.69%	▼2.7
Registered electors		64,201		▲
Margin of victory		6,011	28.96%	▼0.27
Jana Congress gain from INC				

=== 1961 ===
1961 Odisha Legislative Assembly election: Bahalda
Party	Candidate	Votes	%	±%
INC	Soren Sunaram	10,602	53.04%	▲26.6
AIGP	Majhee Mahindra	4,759	23.81%	▼4.36
Jharkhand Party	Triya Hardev	4,627	23.15%	New
Total valid votes		19,988		
Rejected ballots		1,679		
Turnout		21,667	39.29%	▲11.9
Registered electors		55,141		
Margin of victory		5,843	29.23%	▲11.9
INC gain from Independent				

=== 1957 ===
1957 Odisha Legislative Assembly election: Bahalda
Party	Candidate	Votes	%	±%
Independent	Sundarmohun Hemrom (ST)	6,752	45.41%	New
AIGP	Mahendra Majhi (ST)	4,189	28.17%	New
INC	Sunaram Soren (ST)	3,928	26.42%	▼43.3
Turnout		14,869	27.35%	▼1.29
Registered electors		54,361		▼
Margin of victory		2,563	17.24%	▼36.3
Independent gain from INC				

=== 1951 ===
1952 Odisha Legislative Assembly election: Bahalda
Party	Candidate	Votes	%	±%
INC	Sonaram Soren	11,012	69.78%	
Socialist Party (India)	Kale Majhi	2,557	16.20%	
Independent	Syamchandran Hasda	2,212	14.02%	
Turnout		15,781	28.64%	
Registered electors		55,100		
Margin of victory		8,455	53.58%	
INC win (new seat)				

== Notes ==
- The 2011 Odisha Reference Annual mentions the 1957 elected MLA, Surendramohan Hembram as belonging to the Gana Parishad. This is inconsistent with the detailed Statistical Report by ECI, which mentions the same elected MLA, but as being an Independent politician.
- Similarly, the 2011 Odisha Reference Annual mentions the 1971 elected MLA, Sashibhusan Marndi as being an Independent politician. This is inconsistent with the detailed Statistical Report by ECI, which mentions the same elected MLA, but as belonging to the Jharkhand Party.
