= Sunaram Soren =

Indian politician from Odisha

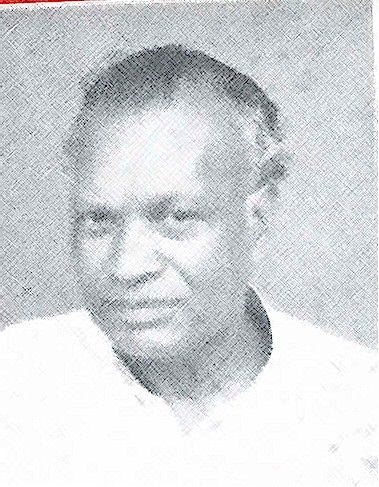
- Sonaram Soren

Member of the Odisha Legislative Assembly
- In office 1977–1980
- Preceded by: Sashibhusan Marandi
- Succeeded by: Ramchandra Hansdah
- Constituency: Bahalda
- In office 1961–1971
- Preceded by: Surendramohan Hembram
- Succeeded by: Sashibhusan Marandi
- Constituency: Bahalda
- In office 1951–1957
- Preceded by: office established
- Succeeded by: Surendramohan Hembram
- Constituency: Bahalda

Minister of State of Odisha
- Cabinet minister
- In office 20 February 1952 – 19 October 1956
- Chief Minister: Nabakrushna Choudhury
- Ministry: Tribal and Rural Welfare, Commerce, Labour

Personal details
- Born: 4 February 1918 Hesela, Bahalda, Mayurbhanj State, British India (now Mayurbhanj district, Odisha)
- Died: 19 July 1988 (aged 70)
- Party: Janata Party
- Other political affiliations: Jharkhand Party; Orissa Jana Congress; Indian National Congress
- Spouse: Sona Soren
- Children: 1
- Parent: Champati Ram Soren (father)
- Education: B.A LLB
- Occupation: Agriculturist, Politician

Sunaram Soren (also spelled Sonaram; 4 February 1918 - 19 July 1988) was an Indian politician from Odisha. He served four terms as a Member of the Odisha Legislative Assembly and was a state cabinet minister.

== Personal life ==
Soren was born on 4 February 1918 in Hesela village of Bahalda, in the erstwhile Mayurbhanj State (now in Mayurbhanj district, Odisha).

He earned a Bachelor of Arts and a Bachelor of Laws (LLB) from Ravenshaw College, Cuttack, and began practicing law in Baripada in 1940.

== Career ==
=== Early activism ===
Soren was inclined toward ethnic solidarity from an early age and associated with several prominent activists. In 1939, at the age of 21, he became a member of Raghunath Murmu’s association "Ol Samiti" to promote the Ol Chiki script for Santali literature. His interest in tribal issues further deepened during his work in the court of the Mayurbhanj State at Baripada. Influenced by Jaipal Singh Munda’s organization Adivasi Mahasabha and its demand for tribal autonomy, he also founded the Mayurbhanj Adivasi Mahasabha in 1946, with its headquarter in Rairangpur, and served as its president.

After India’s independence, on 16 September 1947, Soren wrote to Maharaja Pratap Chandra Bhanjdeo of Mayurbhanj expressing his wish for the state to merge with a proposed Jharkhand. Recognising tribal political aspirations, the Maharaja appointed Soren and other tribal leaders to the state assembly and the cabinet. Soren became leader of opposition in the house. The sentiment then shifted toward remaining an independent state. However, with the Vallabhbhai Patel-led integration of princely states into India, Mayurbhanj’s independence was considered unfeasible. On 16 September 1948, Soren demanded a plebiscite on the state’s future, following the successful merger of the princely states of Saraikela and Kharsawan with Bihar on 18 May 1948 after months of amalgamation unrest. He also led a rally in Baripada from 2 to 6 November 1948 opposing the merger proposals with Odisha. But, in view of conflicting political aspirations among leaders in the state assembly and social mismanagement, the Maharaja signed the merger agreement with India on 9 November 1948. On 1 January 1949, Mayurbhanj officially merged with Odisha. Subsequently, dissatisfied Soren led Mahasabha declared a civil disobedience movement on 8–9 January 1949, after V. P. Menon rejected their demand, which turned violent. Soren and other leaders were arrested on 4 February 1949 and the collector imposed various precautionary measures in the region.

On 6 February, Soren’s followers organised an assembly at Gunduria demanding his release and to protest the merger with Odisha, which led to a confrontation with the authorities. The subdivisional officer subsequently ordered firing by invoking Section 144 of the CrPC, and the ensuing unrest lasted for about two months. The event is variously referred to as the Gunduria incident or the Gunduria massacre. On 19 April, Dr. Harekrushna Mahtab visited Rairangpur to assess the situation. Following this, criminal cases against Soren and others were withdrawn, and they were released from jail. After his release, Soren went to Ranchi, aiming to continue the agitation from outside Odisha.

=== Legislative career ===
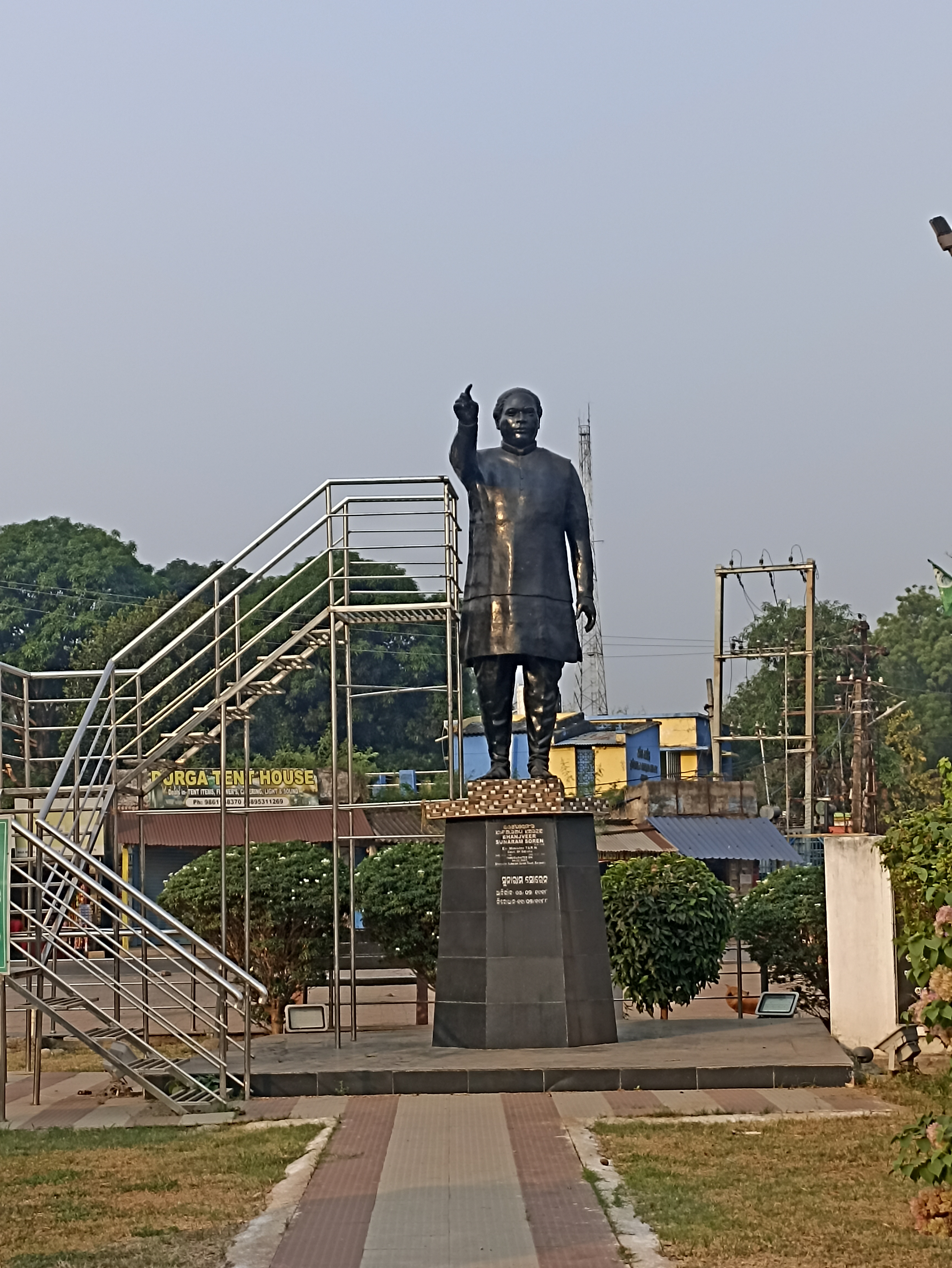
Statue of Sunaram Soren in Baripada, enacted in 2010s.

Soren returned to Odisha after political invitation, and contested the 1952 Odisha Legislative Assembly election from Bahalda on the base of his organisation as an Indian National Congress candidate and became the constituency’s first MLA. Due to his role in tribal politics, he was appointed Minister for Tribal and Rural Welfare, Commerce, and Labour in Nabakrushna Choudhury’s cabinet from 20 February 1952 to 19 October 1956. After two year being elected to the assembly, he merged his organisation into Nikhil Utkal Adivasi Congress to counter the territorial claims of Jharkhand Party.

He lost the 1957 election to Jharkhand Party backed independent candidate Surendramohan Hembram but regained the seat in 1961 as a Congress candidate. In 1966, when the Congress in Odisha split to form the Orissa Jana Congress, Soren joined the Odisha fraction and retained his seat in the 1967 election.

In 1971 assembly elections, he did not participate, and the Bahalda and neighbouring constituency Rairangpur were won by All India Jharkhand Party candidates Sashi Bhushan Marandi and Sidha Lal Murmu respectively. However, in 1974, he contested as a Jharkhand Party candidate but lost to Marandi, who contested as an Independent candidate. In 1977, he won back the seat as a Janata Party candidate and served until 1980.

Electoral history
| Election | House | Constituency | Party | Votes | % | Result |
|---|---|---|---|---|---|---|
| 1977 | Odisha Legislative Assembly | Bahalda | JP | 11,321 | 59.19 | Won |
| 1974 | Odisha Legislative Assembly | Bahalda | JKP | 4,980 | 19.96 | Lost |
| 1967 | Odisha Legislative Assembly | Bahalda | OJC | 10,947 | 52.74 | Won |
| 1961 | Odisha Legislative Assembly | Bahalda | INC | 10,602 | 53.04 | Won |
| 1957 | Odisha Legislative Assembly | Bahalda | INC | 3,928 | 26.42 | Lost |
| 1951 | Odisha Legislative Assembly | Bahalda | INC | 11,012 | 86.78 | Won |

== Death ==
Soren died on 19 July 1988 at the age of 67.
