= Mayurbhanj Lok Sabha constituency =

Lok Sabha constituency in Odisha

Coordinates: 21.929411°N 86.744454°E

Mayurbhanj (ST) OD-5
- Lok Sabha constituency
- Interactive map of Mayurbhanj Lok Sabha constituency

Constituency details
- Country: India
- Region: East India
- State: Odisha
- Assembly constituencies: Jashipur; Saraskana; Rairangpur; Bangriposi; Udala; Baripada; Morada
- Established: 1952
- Total electors: 15,46,274 (Note: as on 2024) (Note: as data published by election commission)
- Reservation: ST

Member of Parliament
- 18th Lok Sabha
- Incumbent Naba Charan Majhi
- Party: BJP
- Elected year: 2024

Mayurbhanj Lok Sabha constituency is one of the 21 Lok Sabha (parliamentary) constituencies in Odisha state in Eastern India.

== Assembly Segments ==
Following the 2008 delimitation, presently this constituency comprises the following legislative assembly segments:

#	Name	District	Member	Party	Leading (in 2024)
26	Jashipur (ST)	Mayurbhanj	Ganesh Ram Khuntia	BJP	BJP
27	Saraskana (ST)	Mayurbhanj	Bhadav Hansdah	BJP	BJP
28	Rairangpur (ST)	Mayurbhanj	Jalen Naik	BJP	BJP
29	Bangriposi (ST)	Mayurbhanj	Sanjali Murmu	BJP	BJP
31	Udala (ST)	Mayurbhanj	Bhaskar Madhei	BJP	BJP
33	Baripada (ST)	Mayurbhanj	Prakash Soren	BJP	BJP
34	Morada	Mayurbhanj	Krushna Chandra Mohapatra	BJP	BJP

Before delimitation of parliamentary constituencies in 2008, legislative assembly segments which constituted this parliamentary constituency were: Jashipur, Bahalda, Rairangpur, Bangriposi, Kuliana, Baripada and Udala.

== Elected members ==
Vote share of winning candidates
2024	49.91%
2019	42.01%
2014	29.66%
2009	21.87%
2004	37.43%
1999	52.97%
1998	42.09%
1996	38.89%
1993 (bypoll)	54.02%
1991	36.06%
1989	46.48%
1984	58.25%
1980	56.12%
1977	47.91%
1972 (bypoll)	42.53%
1971	28.82%

Since its formation in 1952, 20 elections have been held till date including two bypoll in 1972 and 1993.

List of members elected from Mayurbhanj constituency are

Year	Member	Party
1952	Ram Chandra Majhi	Indian National Congress
1957	Ram Chandra Majhi	Independent politician
1962	Maheswar Naik	Indian National Congress
1967	Mahendra Majhi	Swatantra Party
1971	Manmohan Tudu	Indian National Congress
1972 (bypoll) (Note: Resignation of Manmohan Tudu)	Chandra Mohan Sinha	Utkal Congress
1977	Chandra Mohan Sinha	Bharatiya Lok Dal
1980	Manmohan Tudu	Indian National Congress (I)
1984	Sidha Lal Murmu	Indian National Congress
1989	Bhagey Gobardhan	Janata Dal
1991	Bhagey Gobardhan	Independent politician
1993 (bypoll) (Note: Death of Bhagey Gobardhan)	Sushila Tiriya	Indian National Congress
1996	Sushila Tiriya	Indian National Congress
1998	Salkhan Murmu	Bharatiya Janata Party
1999	Salkhan Murmu	Bharatiya Janata Party
2004	Sudam Marndi	Jharkhand Mukti Morcha
2009	Laxman Tudu	Biju Janata Dal
2014	Rama Chandra Hansdah	Biju Janata Dal
2019	Bishweswar Tudu	Bharatiya Janata Party
2024	Naba Charan Majhi	Bharatiya Janata Party

== Election results ==
=== 2024 ===
Voting were held on 1st June 2024 in 7th phase of Indian General Election. Counting of votes was on 4th June 2024. In 2024 election, Bharatiya Janata Party candidate Naba Charan Majhi defeated Biju Janata Dal candidate Sudam Marndi by margin of 2,19,334 votes.

2024 Indian general election: Mayurbhanj
Party	Candidate	Votes	%	±%
BJP	Naba Charan Majhi	585,971	49.91	▲7.85
BJD	Sudam Marndi	3,66,637	31.23	▼8.63
JMM	Anjani Shibu Soren	1,35,399	11.53	▼0.25
NOTA	None of the above	19,953	1.70	▼0.16
Majority		2,19,334	18.68	▲16.48
Turnout		11,78,141	76.19	▼0.94
BJP hold				

=== 2019 ===
In 2019 election, Bharatiya Janata Party candidate Bishweswar Tudu defeated Biju Janata Dal candidate Debashis Marndi by margin of 25,256 votes.

2019 Indian general elections: Mayurbhanj
Party	Candidate	Votes	%	±%
BJP	Bishweswar Tudu	483,812	42.06	▲16.34
BJD	Debashis Marndi	4,58,556	39.86	▲1.09
JMM	Anjani Shibu Soren	1,35,552	11.78	▼18.14
NOTA	None of the above	21,357	1.86	▼0.37
Independent	Parbati Purty	13,937	1.21	
Majority		25,256	2.20	
Turnout		11,51,693	77.13	
BJP gain from BJD		Swing	▲7.63	

=== 2014 ===
In 2014 election, Biju Janata Dal candidate Rama Chandra Hansdah defeated Bharatiya Janata Party candidate Nepol Raghu Murmu by a margin of 1,22,866 votes.

2014 Indian general elections: Mayurbhanj
Party	Candidate	Votes	%	±%
BJD	Rama Chandra Hansdah	393,779	37.38	
BJP	Nepole Raghu Murmu	2,70,913	25.72	
JMM	Debashish Marandi	1,72,984	16.42	
INC	Shyam Sundar Hansdah	1,42,165	13.50	
NOTA	None of the above	23,517	2.23	−
AOP	Prabhudan Marandi	14,632	1.39	
BSP	Dasmat Soren	12,041	1.14	
Majority		1,22,866	11.66	
Turnout		10,54,555	79.44	
BJD hold				

=== 2009 ===
In 2009 election, Biju Janata Dal candidate Laxman Tudu defeated Jharkhand Mukti Morcha candidate Sudam Marndi by a margin of 66,178 votes.

2009 Indian general elections: Mayurbhanj
Party	Candidate	Votes	%	±%
BJD	Laxman Tudu	256,648	31.08	
JMM	Sudam Marndi	190,470	23.06	
BJP	Droupadi Murmu	150,827	18.26	
INC	Laxman Majhi	140,770	17.04	
Independent	Rameswar Majhi	25,603	3.10	
Majority		66,178	8.02	
Turnout		824,754	70.27	
BJD gain from JMM				

== See also ==
- Mayurbhanj district
- List of constituencies of the Lok Sabha
