= Sananda Marndi =

Politician from Odisha

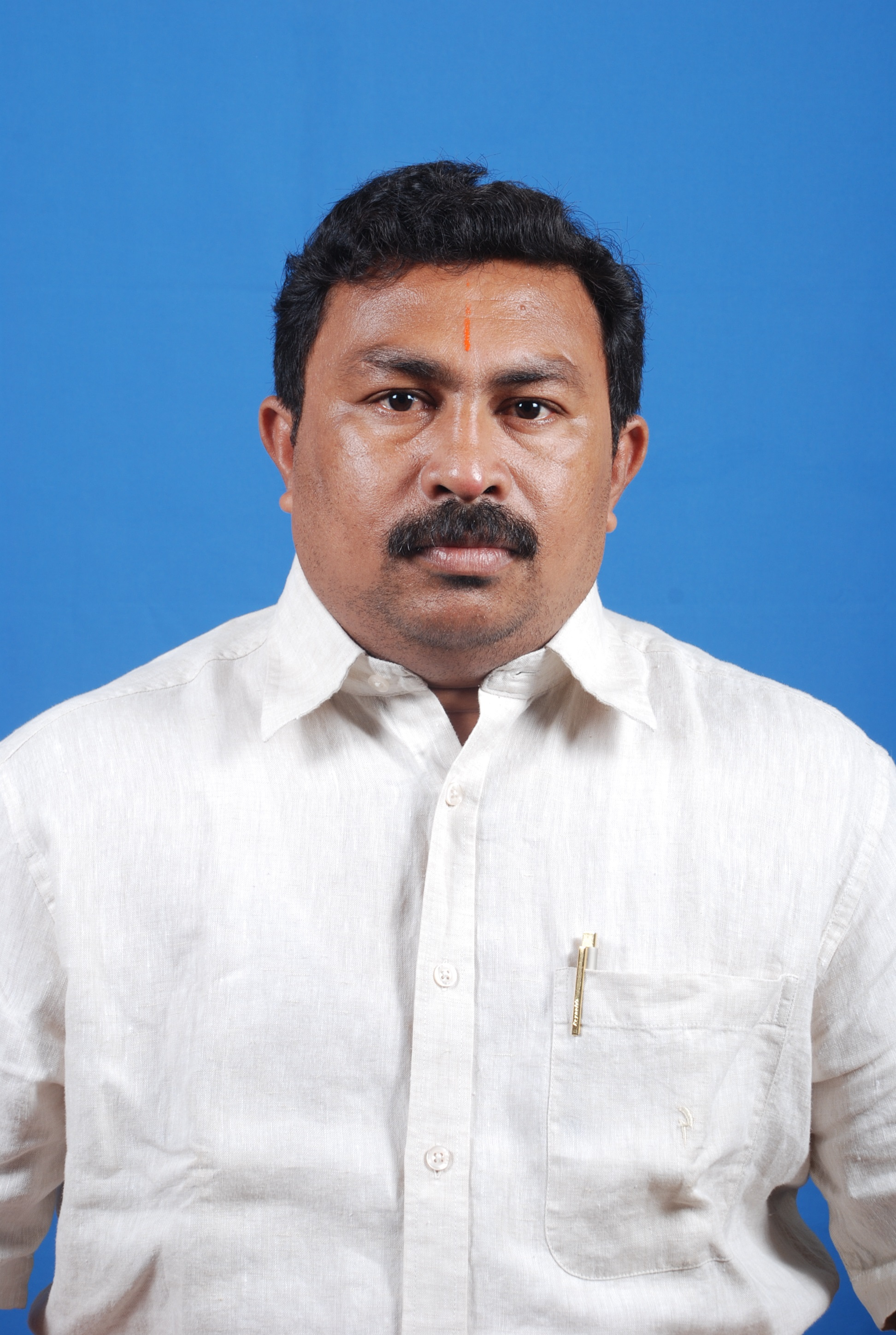

Deputy Speaker of Odisha Legislative Assembly
- In office 2011–2019
- Preceded by: Lal Bihari Himirika
- Succeeded by: Rajanikant Singh

Member of Odisha Legislative Assembly
- In office 2009–2019
- Preceded by: Bimal Lochan Das
- Succeeded by: Prakash Soren
- Constituency: Bariapada
- In office 2004–2009
- Preceded by: Sudam Marndi
- Succeeded by: Assembly seat disestablished
- Constituency: Kuliana

Personal details
- Born: June 16, 1971 (age 55) Mayurbhanj, Odisha
- Party: BJD (2009 onwards)
- Other political affiliations: BJP (before 2009)
- Spouse: Kajal Marandi
- Children: 2 daughters
- Parent: Gangadhar Marandi (father)
- Education: B.A.

Sananda Marndi is an Indian politician and agriculturist who served as Deputy Speaker of Odisha Legislative Assembly from 17 August 2011 to 29 May 2019.

== Personal life ==
He was born on June 26, 1971 to Gangadhar Marandi. He is married to Kajal Marandi and has two daughters.
