= Uparbeda =

Village in Odisha, India

Uparbeda (also spelled Uperbeda) is a village in the block of Mayurbhanj district, Odisha, India. Droupadi Murmu, the current President of India, was born here.

== Geography ==
Uparbeda lies on about 280 km from Bhubaneswar, the state capital. The village covers 500 hectares and its census code 388242.

== Demographics ==
As per the 2011 Census of India, Uparbeda is home to 2314 people living in 841 households. The village is predominantly Santhal tribal.

== History ==
Kartik Charan Majhi was elected to the Odisha Legislative Assembly In 1967, and Bhabendra Nath Murmu followed in 1985.

In December 2024, President Droupadi Murmu made her first trip back to Uparbeda after taking office.

== Notable people ==
- Droupadi Murmu – President of India since 2022; born on 20 June 1958 in Uparbeda.
- Kartik Charan Majhi – elected to the Odisha Legislative Assembly in 1967.
- Bhabendra Nath Murmu – Elected to the Odisha Legislative Assembly in 1985.
- Salkhan Murmu – served two terms in the Lok Sabha from Mayurbhanj, winning in 1998 and 1999.

== Education ==
The village has four primary schools, two middle schools and one secondary school.

=== Schools ===
- Saraswati Shishumandir Uparbeda
- K. B. HS Uparbeda
- GOVT UPS Uparbeda

== Infrastructure ==
Electricity, roads, and drinking water available. A public health centre serves Uparbeda and the surrounding villages.
