= Bikashnagar =

BikashNagar
- Street
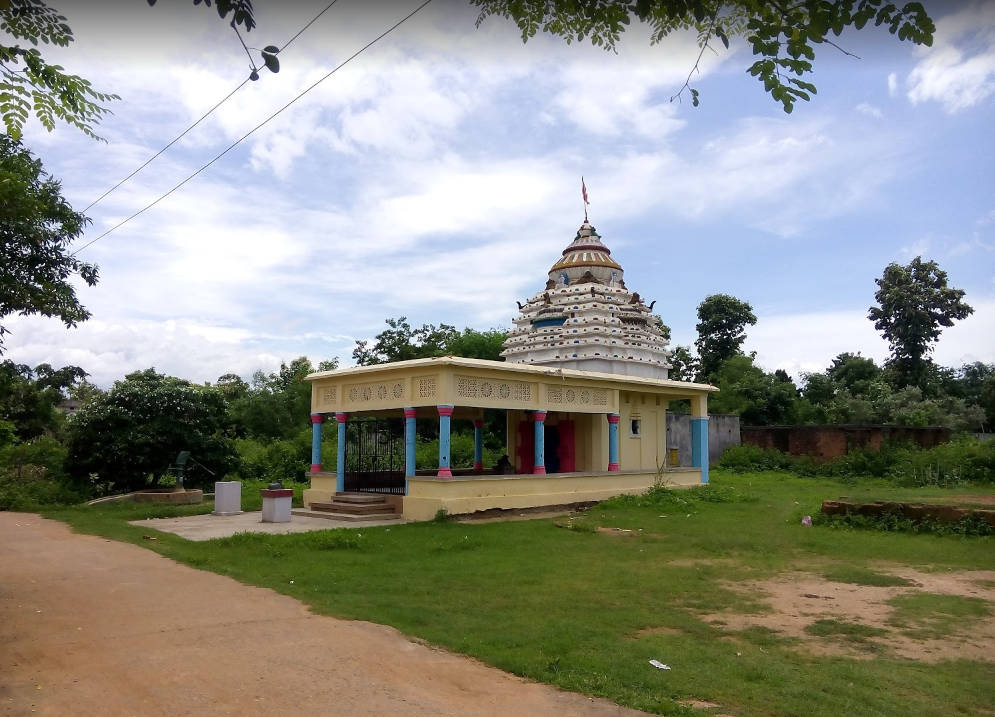
- Nickname: Heart of Rairangpur Town
- Location in Odisha, India BikashNagar (India)
- Coordinates: 22.27°N 86.17°E
- Country: India
- State: Odisha
- District: Mayurbhanj
- Elevation: 248 m (814 ft)

Population (2017)
  - Total: 5,729
- Demonym: Rairangpurians

Languages
  - Official: Odia
- Time zone: UTC+5:30 (IST)
- PIN: 757 043
- Telephone code: 06794
- Website: www.mayurbhanj.nic.in

Bikashnagar is a small village of Rairangpur city in Mayurbhanj district in the state of Odisha, India.

== Geography ==
BikashNagar Street is located at 22.27°N 86.17°E. It has an average elevation of 248 m (814 ft).
