= Gobinda Chandra Majhi =

Santali language writer (1956–2020)

Gobind Chandra Majhi
- Born: 17 May 1956 (age 69); Bahalda, Mayurbhanj
- Education: BA, LL.B
- Alma mater: Buxi Jagabandhu Bidyadhar College,(BJB College)Bhubaneswar Madhusudan Law College, Cuttack
- Occupations: Sr. manager syndicate bank(retd.), writer, poet
- Spouse: Bijaylaxmi Majhi
- Children: Arati Soren, Meenati Manjari Soren, Bhairab Singh Soren, Sumati Baha Soren, Mansingh Soren
- Parent(s): Bhilu Soren, Aarsu Soren
- Awards: Sahitya Akademi Award New Delhi, Dr. B.R. Ambedkar fellowship by Dalit Sahiyta Academi New Delhi, Sadhu Ramchand Murmu Award by All India Santali Writers' Association, SyndRatna Award by Corporate Office Syndicate Bank Bengaluru.

Gobind Chandra Majhi (born 17 May 1956) is a Santali language writer. He was nominated for the Sahitya Academy Award in 2016. After his retirement from his banking job, Majhi began working as the vice president of Odisha chapter of All India Santali Writers Association.

== Personal life and education ==
Gobinda Chandra was born in 1956 at Bahalada in the Mayurbhanj district of Odisha to father Bhilu Soren and mother Aarsu Soren. He passed his matriculation from Bahalda Govt High School. He then graduated from Buxi Jagabandhu Bidyadhar College, Bhubaneswar and attained LLB from Madhusudan Law College, Cuttack. He worked with Syndicate Bank and retired as a Senior Manager. Post retirement he has been busy pursuing his literary activities.

== Literary life ==
Majhi has been active both in Santali literature and films. "Bapla" and "Jolon" are two Santali movies he has been involved with.

=== Major works ===
- Nalha – 2014
- Mid Tidag Sindur
- Hams Hamsali
- Sagen Sakam
- Nawa Sagen Sakam
- Sobonakha
- Jahergarh
- Karam Siram
- Sari Saarajom
- Maantar
- Sondhyani
- Sabata Aadang Sarikhe

== Awards ==
- Sahitya Academy Award – 2016
- Dalit Sahitya Academy Award
- BBR Ambedkar Fellowship
- SyndRatna Award by Corporate Office Syndicate Bank Bengaluru
