= Lipsa Hembram =

Indian Santali fashion designer

Lipsa Hembram is an Indian fashion designer. She works on traditional women's Santal's costumes. She started her business in 2014.

Hembram was born in a Santali family in Rairangpur of Mayurbhanj, Odisha. She completed her degree in fashion technology at National Institute of Fashion Technology in Hyderabad.
