= Baripada Assembly constituency =

Constituency of the Odisha legislative assembly in India

Coordinates: 21.94°N 86.75°E

Baripada
- Constituency No. 33 for the Odisha Legislative Assembly

Constituency details
- Country: India
- Region: East India
- State: Odisha
- Division: Central Division
- District: Mayurbhanj
- Lok Sabha constituency: Mayurbhanj
- Established: 1951
- Total electors: 2,25,354 (Note: as on 2024) (Note: as data published by election commission)
- Reservation: ST

Member of Legislative Assembly
- 17th Odisha Legislative Assembly
- Incumbent Prakash Soren
- Party: Bharatiya Janata Party
- Elected year: 2024

Baripada is a Vidhan Sabha constituency of Mayurbhanj district, Odisha.

Area of this constituency includes Baripada town, Baripada block, Khunta block and 9 GPs (Gudialbandh, Jadunathpur, Jarkani, Khanua, Naupal, Purnachandpur, Sankerko, Tangasol and Uthaninuagaon) of Badasahi block.

== Elected members ==
Vote share of winning candidates
2024	48.39%
2019	45.08%
2014	37.49%
2009	29.66%
2004	35.26%
2000	43.17%
1995	36.81%
1990	37.59%
1985	54.64%
1980	50.94%
1977	32.88%

Since its formation in 1951, 17 elections were held till date. It was a 2-member constituency for 1952 & 1957.

List of members elected from Baripada constituency are:

Election	Portrait	Name	Party
2024		Prakash Soren	Bharatiya Janata Party
2019		Prakash Soren	Bharatiya Janata Party
2014		Sananda Marndi	Biju Janata Dal
2009		Sananda Marndi	Biju Janata Dal
2004		Bimal Lochan Das	Jharkhand Mukti Morcha
2000		Kishore Dash	Jharkhand Mukti Morcha
1995		Prasanna Kumar Dash	Indian National Congress
1990		Chhatish Chandra Dhal	Janata Dal
1985		Prasanna Kumar Dash	Indian National Congress
1980		Prasanna Kumar Dash	Indian National Congress (I)
1977		Prasanna Kumar Dash	Indian National Congress
1974		Pramod Chandra Bhanj Deo	Independent politician
1971		Pramod Chandra Bhanj Deo	Independent politician
1967		Santosh Kumar Sahu	Indian National Congress
1961		Santosh Kumar Sahu	Indian National Congress
1957 (Note: It was a 2 member constituency)		Harihar Mohanty	Praja Socialist Party
1957		Samai Majhi	Independent politician
1951 (Note: It was a 2 member constituency)		Girish Chandra Roy	Socialist Party
1951		Surendra Singh	Indian National Congress

== Election Results ==
=== 2024 ===
Voting were held on 1 June 2024 in 4th phase of Odisha Assembly Election & 7th phase of Indian General Election. Counting of votes was on 4 June 2024. In 2024 election, Bharatiya Janata Party candidate Prakash Soren defeated Biju Janata Dal candidate Sananda Marndi by a margin of 29,385 votes.

2024 Odisha Vidhan Sabha Election, Baripada
Party	Candidate	Votes	%	±%
BJP	Prakash Soren	78,272	48.39	
BJD	Sananda Marndi	48,887	30.22	
INC	Pramod Kumar Hembram	25,626	15.84	
NOTA	None of the above	2,718	1.68	
Majority		29,385	18.17	
Turnout		1,61,757	71.78	
BJP hold				

=== 2019 ===
In the 2019 election, Bharatiya Janata Party candidate Prakash Soren defeated Biju Janata Dal candidate Sarojini Hembram by a margin of 19,411 votes.

2019 Odisha Legislative Assembly election, Baripada
Party	Candidate	Votes	%	±%
BJP	Prakash Soren	72,225	45.08	
BJD	Sarojini Hembram	52,814	32.96	
INC	Dasaratha Singh	26,978	16.84	
NOTA	NOTA	2,325	1.45	−
Majority		19,411	12.12	
Turnout		1,60,228	74.13	
BJP gain from BJD				

=== 2014 ===
In 2014 election, Biju Janata Dal candidate Sananda Marndi defeated Bharatiya Janata Party candidate Nisamani Baske by a margin of 17,114 votes.

2014 Odisha Legislative Assembly election, Baripada
Party	Candidate	Votes	%	±%
BJD	Sananda Marndi	54,131	37.49	7.83
BJP	Nisamani Baske	37,017	25.64	2.03
INC	Priyabrata Majhi	21,933	15.19	0.31
JMM	Fagu Hansda	19,214	13.31	12.18
NOTA	None of the above	2,199	1.52	−
Majority		17,114	11.85	
Turnout		1,44,388	76.21	7.92
Registered electors		1,89,471		
BJD hold				

=== 2009 ===
In 2009 election, Biju Janata Dal candidate Sananda Marndi defeated Jharkhand Mukti Morcha candidate Bhadav Hansdah by a margin of 4,760 votes.

2009 Odisha Legislative Assembly election, Baripada
Party	Candidate	Votes	%	±%
BJD	Sananda Marndi	33,840	29.66	−
JMM	Bhadav Hansdah	29,080	25.49	−
BJP	Golak Bihari Naik	26,940	23.61	−
INC	Kanhu Soren	16,979	14.88	−
Majority		4,760	4.17 (Note: %of total valid votes)	−
Turnout		1,14,213	68.29	−
BJD gain from JMM				
