= Mahendra Majhi =

Indian politician

Member of Parliament, Lok Sabha
- In office 1967–1971
- Preceded by: Maheswar Naik
- Succeeded by: Chandra Mohan Sinha
- Constituency: Mayurbhanj, Odisha

Personal details
- Born: September 9, 1920 Rairangpur, Mayurbhanj district, Odisha, British India
- Died: 1971
- Party: Swatantra Party
- Spouse: Chandrabati Majhi

Mahendra Majhi (1920–1971) was an Indian politician. He was elected to the Lok Sabha, the lower house of the Parliament of India as a member of the Swatantra Party.
