= Maheswar Naik =

Indian politician

Member of Parliament, Lok Sabha
- In office 1962–1967
- Preceded by: R. C. Majhi
- Succeeded by: Mahendra Majhi
- Constituency: Mayurbhanj, Odisha

Member of Parliament, Rajya Sabha
- In office 3-4-1956 to 27-2-1962
- Constituency: Odisha

Personal details
- Born: July 1906
- Died: 20 February 1986 (aged 79)
- Party: Indian National Congress

Maheswar Naik (1906 - 1986) was an Indian politician and Member of Parliament, in 3rd Lok Sabha and Rajya Sabha as a member of the Indian National Congress.

== Early life and background ==
Maheswar Naik was born in July 1906 at Mayurbhanj. Shri Ram Krishna Naik was his father. He completed his education in B.A. from Ravenshaw College, Cuttack and Patna University.

== Personal life ==
Maheswar Naik married to Shrimati Surendri Devi and the couple has 2 sons and 1 daughter.

== Positions held ==
#	From	To	Position
1.	1944	1946	MLA (1st term) Mayurbhanj State Legislative Assembly.
2.	1947	1949	MLA (2nd term) Mayurbhanj State Legislative Assembly.: Scout Commissioner, Mayurbhanj (1947 - 1949).; Minister for Development and Education (1947 - 1949).
3.	1950	1952	Member of Provisional Parliament.
4.	1956	1962	MP in Rajya Sabha.
5.	1962	1967	MP in 3rd Lok Sabha from Mayurbhanj.
