= Naba Charan Majhi =

Indian politician

Member of Parliament, Lok Sabha
- Incumbent
- Assumed office 4 June 2024
- Preceded by: Bishweswar Tudu
- Constituency: Mayurbhanj

Member of Odisha Legislative Assembly
- In office 23 May 2019 – 4 June 2024
- Preceded by: Saiba Sushil Kumar Hansdah
- Succeeded by: Jalen Naik
- Constituency: Rairangpur

Personal details
- Born: 18 April 1961 (age 65) Mahuldiha, Rairangpur, Mayurbhanj District, Odisha
- Party: Bhartiya Janta Party
- Parent: Duma Majhi (father)
- Education: B.A. (History)
- Alma mater: Rairangpur College, (under Utkal University)

Naba Charan Majhi is an Indian politician and Lok Sabha member from Rairangpur, Odisha. He was elected as a Member of Parliament from Mayurbhanj Lok Sabha constituency. He is associated with Bharatiya Janata Party.
