= Saraskana Assembly constituency =

Constituency of the Odisha legislative assembly in India

Coordinates: 22.25°N 86.59°E

Saraskana
- Constituency No. 27 for the Odisha Legislative Assembly

Constituency details
- Country: India
- Region: East India
- State: Odisha
- Division: Central Division
- District: Mayurbhanj
- Lok Sabha constituency: Mayurbhanj
- Established: 2009
- Total electors: 2,09,605 (Note: as on 2024) (Note: as data published by election commission)
- Reservation: ST

Member of Legislative Assembly
- 17th Odisha Legislative Assembly
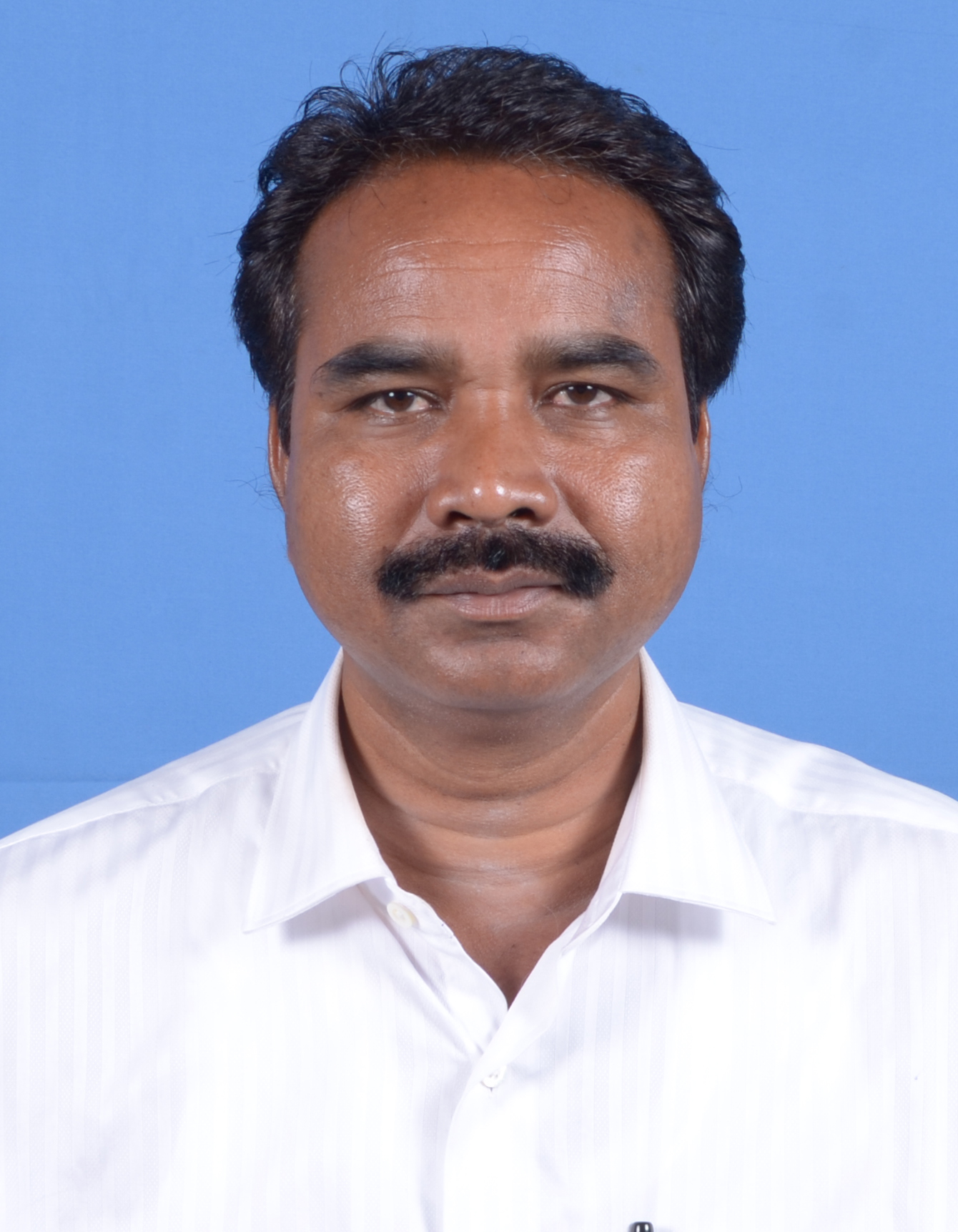
- Incumbent Bhadav Hansdah
- Party: Bharatiya Janata Party
- Elected year: 2019

Saraskana is a Vidhan Sabha constituency of Mayurbhanj district, Odisha.

Area of this constituency includes Saraskana block, Bijatala block, Bisoi block and 3 GPs (Jaypur, Kusumi and Mayurdar) of Kusumi block.

The constituency was formed in 2008 Delimitation and went for polls in 2009 election.

== Elected members ==
Vote share of winning candidates
2019	37.79%
2019	34.28%
2014	32.16%
2009	35.75%

Since its formation in 2009, 4 elections were held till date.

List of members elected from Saraskana constituency are:

Year	Member	Party
2024	Bhadav Hansdah	Bharatiya Janata Party
2019	Budhan Murmu	Bharatiya Janata Party
2014	Bhadav Hansdah	Biju Janata Dal
2009	Rama Chandra Hansdah	Nationalist Congress Party

== Election results ==
=== 2024 ===
Voting were held on 1 June 2024 in 4th phase of Odisha Assembly Election & 7th phase of Indian General Election. Counting of votes was on 4 June 2024. In 2024 election, Bharatiya Janata Party candidate Bhadav Hansdah defeated Biju Janata Dal candidate Debashish Marandi by a margin of 13,652 votes.

2024 Odisha Vidhan Sabha Election, Saraskana
Party	Candidate	Votes	%	±%
BJP	Bhadav Hansdah	59,387	37.79	
BJD	Debashish Marandi	45,735	29.11	
JMM	Anjani Soren	20,725	13.19	
INC	Ram Kumar Soren	19,634	12.49	
NOTA	None of the above	2,009	1.28	
Majority		13,652	8.68	
Turnout		1,57,136	74.97	
hold				

=== 2019 ===
In 2019 election, Bharatiya Janata Party candidate Budhan Murmu defeated Biju Janata Dal candidate Amar Singh Tudu by a margin of 6,813 votes.

2019 Odisha Vidhan Sabha Election, Saraskana
Party	Candidate	Votes	%	±%
BJP	Budhan Murmu	53,197	34.28	
BJD	Amar Singh Tudu	46,384	29.89	
JMM	Mahesh Chandra Hembram	34,831	22.44	
Independent	Rama Chandra Hansdah	10,036	6.47	
NOTA	None of the above	2206	1.42	
Majority		6,813	4.39 (Note: % of total valid votes)	
Turnout		1,55,184	76.02	
BJP gain from BJD				

=== 2014 ===
In 2014 election, Biju Janata Dal candidate Bhadav Hansdah defeated Jharkhand Mukti Morcha candidate Ramchandra Murmu by a margin of 3,839 votes.

2014 Vidhan Sabha Election, Saraskana
Party	Candidate	Votes	%	±%
BJD	Bhadav Hansdah	46,867	32.16	
JMM	Ramhandra Murmu	43,028	29.52	
BJP	Narendra Nath Singh	23,447	16.09	
INC	Berel Sirka	20,040	13.75	
NOTA	None of the above	1,805	1.24	
Majority		3,839	2.64 (Note: % of total valid votes)	
Turnout		1,45,751	79.67	
BJD gain from NCP				

=== 2009 ===
In 2009 election, Nationalist Congress Party candidate Rama Chandra Hansdah defeated Jharkhand Mukti Morcha candidate Ramchandra Murmu by a margin of 14,590 votes.

2009 Vidhan Sabha Election, Sarskana
Party	Candidate	Votes	%	±%
NCP	Rama Chandra Hansdah	39,832	35.75	−
JMM	Ramchandra Murmu	25,242	22.65	−
BJP	Majhiram Tudu	17,657	15.85	−
INC	Sanatan Munda	16,667	14.96	−
Majority		14,590	13.09 (Note: % of total valid votes)	−
Turnout		1,11,516	69.87	−
NCP win (new seat)				
