= Bishweswar Tudu =

Indian politician (born 1965)

Bisweshwar Tudu
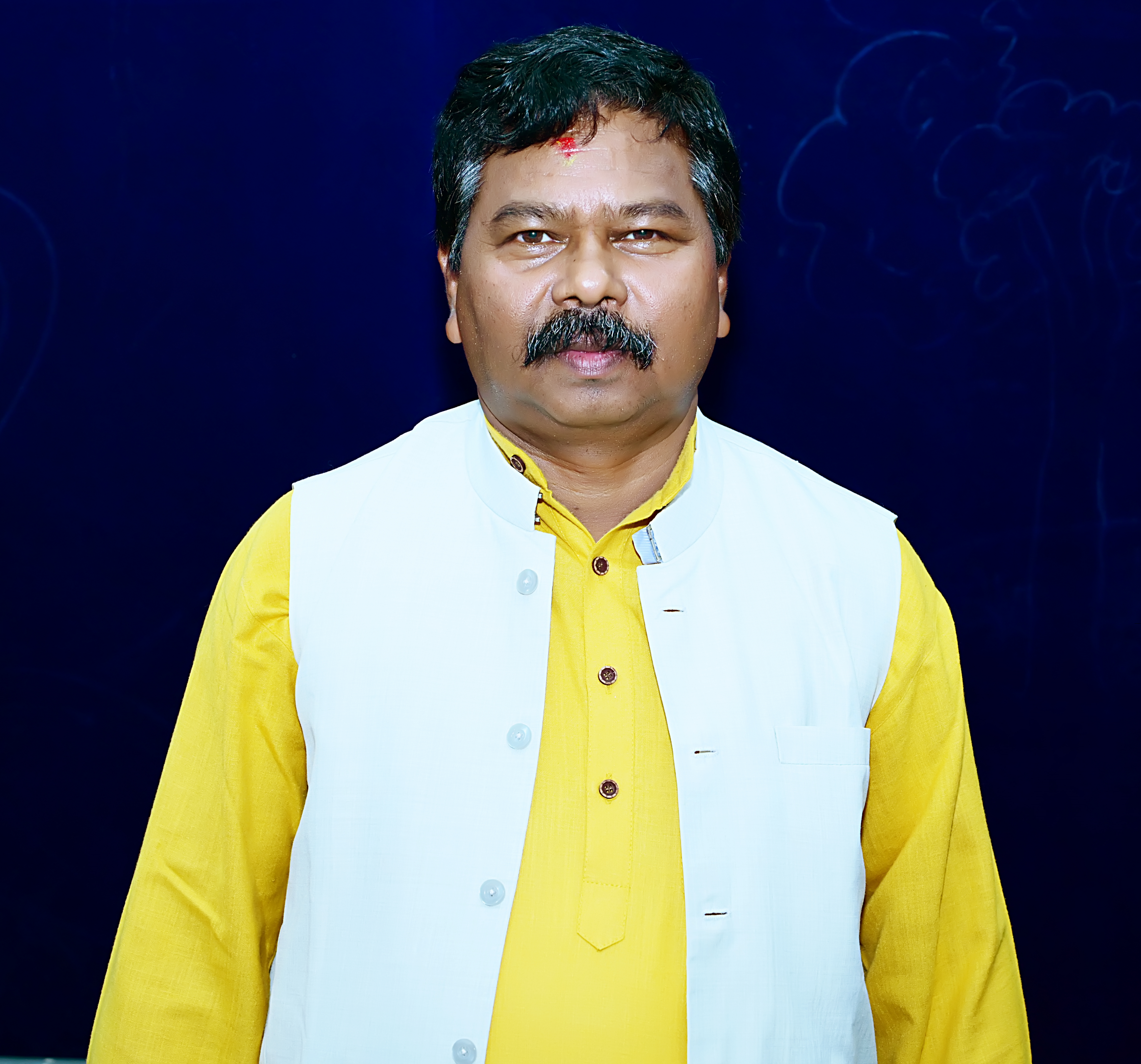

Minister of State for Ministry of Jal Shakti
- In office 7 July 2021 – 11 June 2024
- Prime Minister: Narendra Modi
- Minister: Gajendra Singh Shekhawat
- Preceded by: Rattan Lal Kataria

Minister of State for Ministry of Tribal Affairs
- In office 7 July 2021 – 11 June 2024
- Prime Minister: Narendra Modi
- Minister: Arjun Munda

Member of Parliament, Lok Sabha
- In office 23 May 2019 – 4 June 2024
- Preceded by: Rama Chandra Hansdah
- Succeeded by: Naba Charan Majhi
- Constituency: Mayurbhanj

Personal details
- Born: 28 March 1965 (age 61) Khuntapal, Mayurbhanj, Odisha
- Party: Bharatiya Janata Party
- Spouse: Sumitra Tudu
- Children: 3 (1 son and 2 daughters)
- Education: Diploma in Electrical Engineering
- Alma mater: Utkalmani Gopabandhu Institute of Engineering
- Profession: Politician

Bisweshwar Tudu (born 28 March 1965) is an Indian politician from Odisha who served as the Union Minister of State for Tribal Affairs and Jal Shakti in the Second Modi ministry from 7 July 2021 until 9 June 2024. He is a member of the Bharatiya Janata Party. He was also a Member of Parliament from Mayurbhanj constituency of Odisha in the 17th Lok Sabha and National Secretary of BJP.
