= Sidha Lal Murmu =

Indian politician

Member of Parliament, Lok Sabha
- In office 1984–1989
- Preceded by: Manmohan Tudu
- Succeeded by: Bhagey Gobardhan
- Constituency: Mayurbhanj

Member Legislative Assembly, Odisha
- In office 1980–1984
- Preceded by: Arjun Majhi
- Succeeded by: Bhabendra Nath Murmu
- Constituency: Rairangpur
- In office 1971–1972
- Preceded by: Kartick Chandra Majhi
- Succeeded by: Arjun Majhi
- Constituency: Rairangpur

Personal details
- Born: 1 November 1935 Dandbosh, Rairangpur, Mayurbhanj State, British India (now Mayurbhanj district Odisha, India)
- Died: 4 June 1999 (aged 63)
- Party: Indian National Congress
- Other political affiliations: All India Jharkhand Party
- Spouse: Rukmani Murmu
- Parent: Raghunath Murmu (father)
- Education: Bachelor of Arts

Sidha Lal Murmu was an Indian politician. He was elected to the Lok Sabha, the lower house of the Parliament of India as a member of the Indian National Congress.

== Political career ==
Electoral history
Election	House	Constituency	Party	Votes	%	Result
1998	Lok Sabha	Mayurbhanj	Ind	1,085	0.18	Lost
1984	Lok Sabha	Mayurbhanj	INC	175,013	58.25	Won
1980	Odisha Legislative Assembly	Rairangpur	INC(I)	11,208	45.53	Won
1974	Odisha Legislative Assembly	Rairangpur	Ind	1,309	4.76	Lost
1971	Odisha Legislative Assembly	Rairangpur	AIJP	9,655	33.37	Won
1967	Odisha Legislative Assembly	Rairangpur	Ind	4,452	15.62	Lost
