= Gorumahisani =

- Location within India
- Coordinates: 22°20′12″N 86°16′27″E
- Country: India
- State: Odisha
- District: Mayurbhanj

Languages
- Time zone: UTC+5:30 (IST)
- PIN: 757042

Gorumahisani is a village and a railway station in Odisha, India. It is located in Rairangpur tahsil of Mayurbhanj district of Odisha, India. It is situated 17 km from Rairangpur and 100 km from district headquarter Baripada. The post office code of place is 757042.

== Iron Ore Mines ==
The town is famous for iron ore mines, which were the first iron ore mines developed in India in 1910 by Maharaja Sriram Chandra Bhanj Deo, ruler of Princely State of Mayurbhanj. He appointed Pramatha Nath Bose, a leading geologist in 1908 to survey the ore deposits. Later the mines were leased to Tata Steel.

== Schools ==
In 2016, a CBSE school opened was by the Government of Odisha viz., Odisha Adarsha Vidyalaya to provide quality education to rural talents.

== Transport ==
It has a railway station, whose railway code is GUMI, which falls under jurisdiction of South Eastern Railway Zone.

As a result of iron ore mines being developed, the town is connected with Tatanagar in 1910 by Bengal Nagpur Railway.

(See: Asansol–Tatanagar–Kharagpur line).
