= R. C. Majhi =

Indian politician

Ram Chandra Majhi

Member of Parliament, Lok Sabha
- In office 1952–1962
- Succeeded by: Maheswar Naik
- Constituency: Mayurbhanj, Odisha

Personal details
- Party: Jharkhand Party
- Spouse: Sauri
- Children: Baladev Hembram, Kashinath Hembram

Ram Chandra Majhi is an Indian politician. He was elected to the Lok Sabha, the lower house of the Parliament of India as a member of the Jharkhand Party.
