= Laxman Tudu =

Indian politician (born 1965)

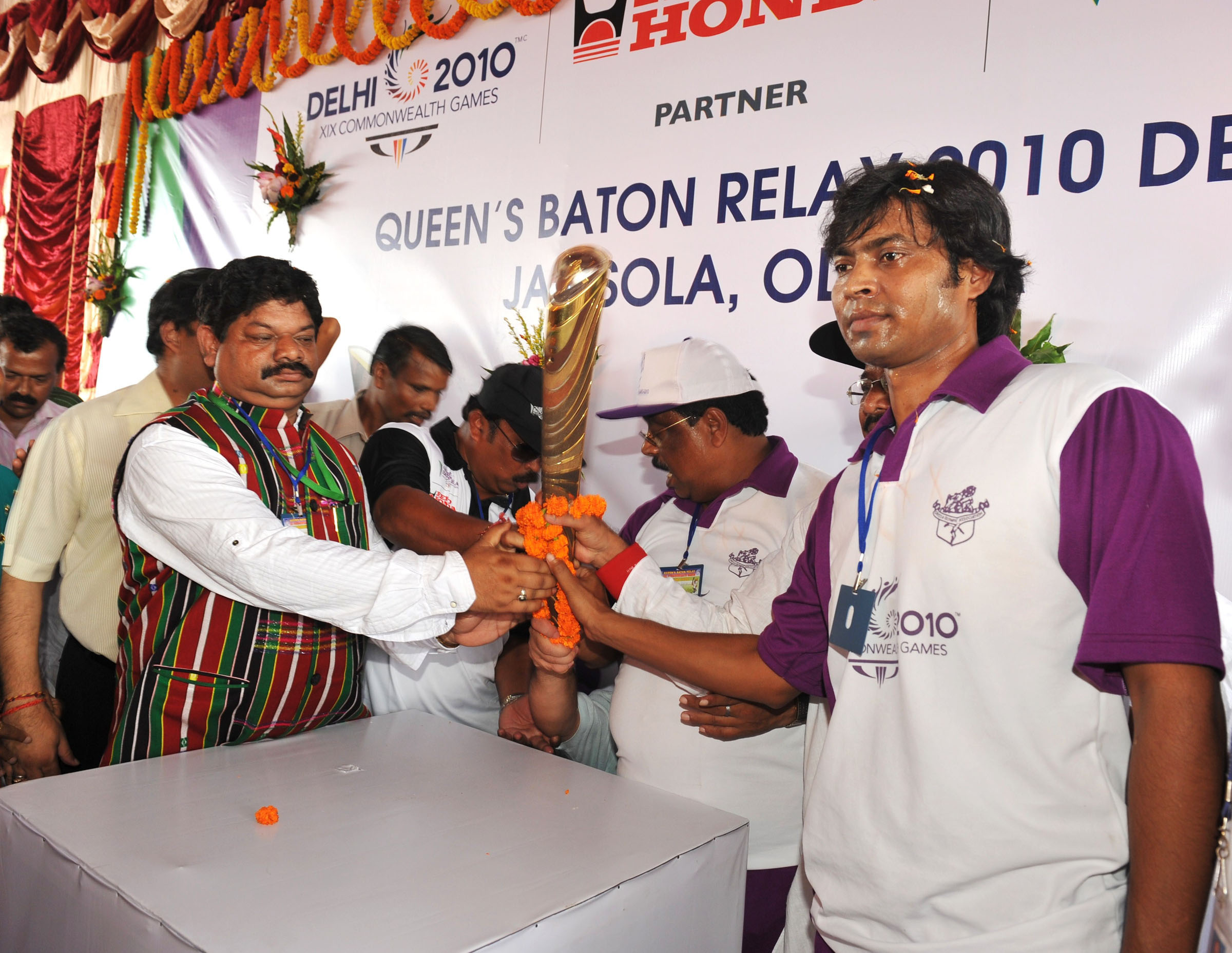
- Shri Laxman Tudu (left) and the National Hockey player, Shri Dilip Tirkey (right) in 2010

Member of Parliament, Lok Sabha
- In office 2009–2014
- Preceded by: Sudam Marndi
- Succeeded by: Rama Chandra Hansdah
- Constituency: Mayurbhanj, Odisha

Personal details
- Born: May 16, 1965 (age 60) Bada Badtalia, Mayurbhanj, Odisha, India
- Party: Jharkhand Mukti Morcha
- Other political affiliations: Biju Janata Dal
- Spouse(s): Basanti Tudu (m. 1998) Late. Jamuna Hansdah
- Education: Graduation
- Alma mater: MPC college, Baripada (Utkal University)

Laxman Tudu (born 16 May 1965) is an Indian politician. He was a Member of Parliament of Lok Sabha during 15th Lok Sabha where he represented Mayurbhanj. In 2018, he quit Biju Janata Dal and joined Jharkhand Mukti Morcha.

== See also ==
- Mayurbhanj (Lok Sabha constituency)
- Indian general election in Orissa, 2009
- Biju Janata Dal
