= Bhagey Gobardhan =

Indian politician (1934–1993)

Minister of State for Human Resources Development
- In office 1990–1991

Member: 9th, 10th Lok Sabha
- In office 1989–1993
- Preceded by: Sidha Lal Murmu
- Succeeded by: Sushila Tiriya
- Constituency: Mayurbhanj, Odisha

Personal details
- Born: 31 October 1934 Jamshedpur, Bihar, British India (now Jharkhand, India)
- Died: 31 July 1993 (aged 58)
- Party: Janata Dal
- Other political affiliations: Indian National Congress, Janata Party
- Spouse: Nirmal Bhagey

Bhagey Gobardhan (31 October 1934 - 31 July 1993) was an Indian politician. He was elected to the Lok Sabha, the lower house of the Parliament of India as a member of the Janata Dal in 1989 he was disqualified from the Lok Sabha under the anti-defection law after he joined the Chandrasekhar government. He later joined the Indian National Congress and was reelected in 1991.
