= Manmohan Tudu =

Indian politician (1922–2007)

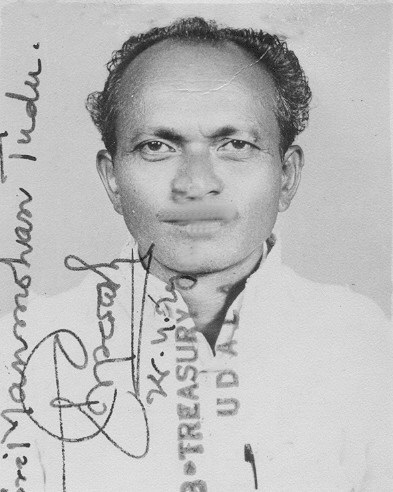
- Manmohan Tudu

Member of Parliament, Lok Sabha
- In office 1971–1972
- Preceded by: Mahendra Majhi
- Succeeded by: Chandra Mohan Sinha
- In office 1980–1984
- Preceded by: Chandra Mohan Sinha
- Succeeded by: Sidha Lal Murmu
- Constituency: Mayurbhanj, Odisha

Personal details
- Born: 14 January 1922 Chadada Village, Udala Taluk, Mayurbhanj District, Orissa, British India
- Died: 2007 (aged 84–85)
- Party: Indian National Congress
- Spouse: Sita Dei

Manmohan Tudu (14 January 1922 – 2007) was an Indian politician.

== Career ==
He was served as 1st, 2nd, 3rd and 4th Member of the Legislative Assembly of Udala Assembly constituency. He was also elected to the Lok Sabha, the lower house of the Parliament of India as a member of the Indian National Congress.

== Death ==
Tudu died in 2007.
