= Salkhan Murmu =

Indian politician

Member of 12th and 13th Lok Sabha
- In office 1998–2004
- Preceded by: Sushila Tiriya
- Succeeded by: Sudam Marndi
- Constituency: Mayurbhanj

Personal details
- Born: 2 June 1952 (age 73) Karandih, Jamshedpur, Singhbhum district, Bihar (present-day East Singhbhum, Jharkhand)
- Party: Jharkhand Disom Party
- Other political affiliations: Bharatiya Janata Party; Janata Dal (United); Nationalist Congress Party
- Spouse: Sumitra Murmu
- Children: 3
- Parents: Ramray Murmu (father); Chita Murmu (mother)
- Education: M. Com, LLB
- Alma mater: Ranchi University, Sambalpur University
- Profession: Trade Unionist, Journalist, Social Worker

Salkhan Murmu is a socio-political activist. He is the founder and national president of Jharkhand Disom Party. He was twice the Member of Parliament in 12th and 13th Lok Sabha from Mayurbhanj constituency in Odisha during the Atal Bihari Vajpayee government.

== Personal life ==
Murmu was born on 2 June 1952 at Karandih, Jamshedpur, then in Singhbhum district of Bihar (now East Singhbhum district, Jharkhand), into a Santal family. His father was Ramray Murmu and his mother was Chita Murmu. His father was originally from Uperbera village in the Rairangpur area of Mayurbhanj district, Odisha, and later migrated to Jamshedpur for employment. Murmu is a cousin of President Droupadi Murmu.

He was studied at St. Xavier High School, Lupungutu, Chaibasa (1969), Lal Bahadur Shastri Memorial College, Karandih (1973), Jamshedpur Co-operative College (B.Com., 1976), Ranchi University (M.Com., 1987), and Sambalpur University (LL.B., 2008). After his graduation, he joined Tata Steel in 1979 as a senior executive and worked there for about ten years. He resigned from the company in 1989 to enter politics.

He married Sumitra Murmu. They have three children.

== Political career ==
Electoral history
Election	House	Constituency	Party	Vote gained	%	Result
2014	Lok Sabha	Singhbhum	JDP	25,547	3.21	Lost
2004	Lok Sabha	Singhbhum	JDP	32,810	6.31	Lost
1999	Lok Sabha	Mayurbhanj	BJP	300,902	52.97	Won
1998	Lok Sabha	Mayurbhanj	BJP	249,255	42.09	Won
2019	Jharkhand Legislative Assembly	Shikaripara	JD(U)	4,445	2.9	Lost
2009	Jharkhand Legislative Assembly	Manoharpur	NCP	6,490	6.68	Lost
1980	Bihar Legislative Assembly	Potka	Ind	9,734	27.35	Lost
