= Rama Chandra Hansdah =

Indian politician

Member: 16th Lok Sabha
- In office 2014–2019
- Preceded by: Laxman Tudu
- Succeeded by: Bisweshwar Tudu
- Constituency: Mayurbhanj

Member: Legislative Assembly of Odisha
- In office 2009–2014
- Succeeded by: Bhadav Hansdah
- Constituency: Saraskana

Personal details
- Party: Indian National Congress
- Other political affiliations: Biju Janata Dal,Nationalist Congress Party
- Profession: Politician

Rama Chandra Hansdah is an Indian politician. He was elected to the 16th Lok Sabha in 2014 from Mayurbhanj constituency in Odisha. He had left Nationalist Congress Party and joined Biju Janata Dal (BJD) in June 2012 along with other three NCP MLAs. He is a former member of Legislative Assembly of Odisha.He was arrested by CBI on 4 November 2014 for his alleged involvement in chit fund scam.

== See also ==
- Indian general election, 2014 (Odisha)
