= Jharkhand Disom Party =

- Abbreviation: JDP
- Founder: Salkhan Murmu
- Founded: 2002
- Dissolved: 18 August 2014 (12 years ago)
- Ideology: Regionalism
- ECI status: Unrecognised Party
- Alliance: Jharkhand Front (2003)

Jharkhand Disom Party (abbr. JDP) was a political party in India, founded in 2002 by Salkhan Murmu, a former Member of Parliament from the Bharatiya Janata Party (BJP). The party works for the rights of the Adivasi peoples, focusing on issues such as increased quotas and reservations in education and employment to address historical marginalization.

In 2003, JDP launched the Jharkhand Front together with four other parties, namely Jharkhand People's Party, Jharkhand Party (Naren), Jharkhand Party (Horo) and Jharkhand Vikas Dal.

In the Lok Sabha elections in 2004, the JDP launched four candidates from West Bengal, two from Bihar and one from Jharkhand.

Jharkhand Disom Party supports Raj Thackeray's Maharashtra Navnirman Sena's agitations against North Indians in Maharashtra.

In August 2014, Salkhan Murmu merged his Jharkhand Disom Party into the BJP in presence of former Jharkhand Chief Minister Arjun Munda.
