= Nikhil Utkal Adivasi Congress =

The Nikhil Utkal Adivasi Congress ('All Orissa Tribal Congress') was a tribal political movemenent in the Indian state of Orissa. It was launched on the initiative of leaders of the Indian National Congress in Orissa, who wanted to counter-mobilize against the territorial claims of the Jharkhand Party on the Orissa tribal belt. The organization was founded by Lal Ranjit Singh Bariha in late 1950. Bariha, Tribal Welfare Minister in the pre-1952 Orissa state government, was accompanied by other ministers in building the organization in the Orissa tribal belt. The Abibasi Mahasabha led by Sonaram Soren merged into the Nikhil Utkal Adivasi Congress. In 1951 the Nikhil Utkal Adivasi Congress was able to counter the Jharkhand movement in Orissa, leading to the marginalization of the latter in Orissa politics. In September 1951 Sonaram Soren was named Acting President of Nikhil Utkal Adivasi Congress.

The organization contested the 1952 elections in alliance with the Indian National Congress. The Nikhil Utkal Adivasi Congress won five seats in the 1952 Orissa Legislative Assembly election. Sonaram Soren was one of the elected legislators and was named became Minister of Tribal and Rural Welfare, Labour and Commerce in the state government. The Nikhil Utkal Adivasi Congress supported the Congress government during its 1952-1957 tenure. Its legislators later joined the Orissa Congress Legislative Party. T. Sanganna, the Nikhil Utkal Adivasi Congress Vice President and who had been elected from the Rayagada-Phulbani seat in the 1952 Indian general election, formed a one-member parliamentary faction of Nikhil Utkal Adivasi Congress in the Lok Sabha. Moreover, Sibnarayan Singh Mahapatra, who was elected as a Member of Parliament from Sundargarh, served as the treasurer of the Nikhil Utkal Adivasi Congress and President of one of its district units from April 1951. Rajya Sabha Member of Parliament Sunder Mohun Hemrom was a member of the organization from 1950 onwards.

The organization again contested the 1957 elections.
