= Bahalda =

- Town
- Location in Odisha, India Bahalda (India)
- Coordinates: 22.40°N 86.08°E
- Country: India
- State: Odisha
- District: Mayurbhanj

Population (2011)
  - Total: 5,425
- Time zone: UTC+5:30 (IST)
- Postal code: 757046
- Vehicle registration: OD 11

Bahalda is a small town in the Mayurbhanj district of northern Odisha, India. Bahalda is the second capital of Mayurbhanj and Bahalda is the second largest town in the Bamanghaty subdivision, and was the capital of Mayurbhanj in the 14th century. Maa Kichakeswari Temple, one of the most famous in northern Odisha sites in the town.

== History ==
Bahalda was headquarters of Bamanghati subdivision until 1919, when the headquarters relocated to Rairangpur.

== Geography ==
Bahalda is located at 22.40°N 86.08°E. It has an average elevation of 234 m (768 ft). It is situated 57 km away from Jamshedpur, 97 km from Baripada, the district headquarters, and 300 km from State capital Bhubaneswar.

== Administration ==
It has a police station, Tahsildar office, block offices, post office, and forest office. There are also a number of banks, including branches of the Bank of India, State Bank of India, Bandhan Bank, Mayurbhanj central co-operative bank, Axis bank and the Odisha Gramya Bank. Local schools include a government high school, a girls' high school, and Ananda Marga, St. Michael, St. Xavier school, Sararaswati sisu Niketan and kids play school a private play school.

== Demographics ==
The majority of the population in the area are tribals, predominantly Ho and Santals. The town has a small marketplace and weekly haat. It is one of the gateways to Jharkhand state. Annual sports are popular, which is celebrated at par with the festivals.

== Transport ==
It is connected with the state capital Bhubaneswar by bus which are plied during the night. The nearest railway station is Bahalda Rd on Tata-Badampahar rail route.

== Temples ==
Kichakeswari Temple is sited in Bahalda, the capital of Mayurbhanj kingdom in the 14th century. It lies at a distance of 97 km from Baripada. Dedicated to Goddess Kichakeswari, the temple is known for its architectural beauty.

== Politics ==
The current MLA from Bahalda Assembly Constituency is Prahlad Purty of JMM, who won the seat in the 2004 State elections. Previous MLAs from this seat were Laxman Soren of BJP who won this seat in 2000, Khelaram Mahali who won in 1995 representing JPP and as an independent candidate in 1990, Bagey Gobardhan of JNP in 1985, Rama Chandra Hansda of INC(I) in 1980, and Sunaram Soren of JNP in 1977.

Bahalda is a part of the Mayurbhanj constituency.
