= Chandra Mohan Sinha =

Politician from Odisha, India

Member of Parliament, Rajya Sabha
- In office 1991–1992
- Constituency: Odisha

Member of Parliament, Lok Sabha
- In office 1972–1980
- Preceded by: Man Mohan Tudu
- Succeeded by: Man Mohan Tudu
- Constituency: Mayurbhanj, Odisha

Personal details
- Born: 22 March 1923 Durgapur Village, Mayurbhanj District, Odisha, British India
- Died: 13 May 2002 (aged 79)
- Party: Janata Dal
- Other political affiliations: Janata Party, Praja Socialist Party

Chandra Mohan Sinha (born 20 June 1958- 13 May 2002) is an Indian politician. He was a member of the Rajya Sabha, the upper house of the Parliament of India as a member of the Janata Dal. He was elected to the Lok Sabha, the lower house of the Parliament of India as a member of the Janata Party .
