= Jalen Naik =

Indian politician

Member of Odisha Legislative Assembly
- Incumbent
- Assumed office 4 June 2024
- Preceded by: Naba Charan Majhi
- Constituency: Rairangpur

Personal details
- Party: Bharatiya Janata Party
- Profession: Politician

Jalen Naik is an Indian politician and an MLA. He was elected to the Odisha Legislative Assembly from Rairangpur Assembly Constituency as a member of the Bharatiya Janata Party.
