= Rairangpur Assembly constituency =

Constituency of the Odisha legislative assembly in India

Coordinates: 22.27°N 86.17°E

Rairangpur
- Constituency No. 28 for the Odisha Legislative Assembly

Constituency details
- Country: India
- Region: East India
- State: Odisha
- Division: Central Division
- District: Mayurbhanj
- Lok Sabha constituency: Mayurbhanj
- Established: 1977
- Total electors: 2,30,824 (Note: as on 2024) (Note: as data published by election commission)
- Reservation: ST

Member of Legislative Assembly
- 17th Odisha Legislative Assembly
- Incumbent Jalen Naik
- Party: Bharatiya Janata Party
- Elected year: 2024

Rairangpur is a constituency of the Odisha Legislative Assembly, in Mayurbhanj district, Odisha.

The constituency comprises Rairangpur town, Rairangpur block, Bahalda block, Jamda block and Tiring block.

== Elected members ==
Since its formation in 1951, 18 elections have been held here till date including one bypoll in 1986.

Election	Name	Party
1952	Haradeb Triya	Indian National Congress
1957	Haradeb Triya	Independent
1961	Chandra Mohan Singh	Indian National Congress
1967	Kartick Chandra Majhi	Swatantra Party
1971	Sidhalal Murmu	All India Jharkhand Party
1974	Arjun Majhi	Utkal Congress
1977	Arjun Majhi	Janata Party
1980	Sidhalal Murmu	Indian National Congress (I)
1985	Bhabendra Nath Murmu	Indian National Congress
1986 (bypoll) (Note: Death of Bhabendra Nath Murmu)	Chaitanya Prasad Majhi	Janata Party
1990	Chaitanya Prasad Majhi	Janata Dal
1995	Laxman Majhi	Indian National Congress
2000	Droupadi Murmu	Bharatiya Janata Party
2004	Droupadi Murmu	Bharatiya Janata Party
2009	Shyam Charan Hansdah	Indian National Congress
2014	Saiba Sushil Kumar Hansdah	Biju Janata Dal
2019	Naba Charan Majhi	Bharatiya Janata Party
2024	Jalen Naik	Bharatiya Janata Party

== Election results ==
Vote share of winning candidates
2024	36.94%
2019	37.31%
2014	32.72%
2009	21.53%
2004	32.66%
2000	34.15%
1995	23.63%
1990	47.23%
1985	50.84%
1980	45.53%
1977	50.28%

=== 2024 ===
Voting was held on 1st June 2024 in 4th phase of Odisha Assembly Election & 7th phase of Indian General Election. Counting of votes was on 4th June 2024. In the 2024 election, Bharatiya Janata Party candidate Jalen Naik defeated Biju Janata Dal candidate Raisin Murmu by a margin of 7,693 votes.

2024 Odisha Legislative Assembly election: Rairangpur
Party	Candidate	Votes	%	±%
BJP	Jalen Naik	62,724	36.94	
BJD	Raisin Murmu	55,031	32.41	
INC	Jogendra Banra	24,224	14.27	
JMM	Sunaram Tudu	17,868	10.52	
NOTA	None of the above	1,824	1.07	
Majority		7,693	4.53	
Turnout		1,69,806	73.57	
BJP hold				

=== 2019 ===
In the 2019 election, Bharatiya Janata Party candidate Naba Charan Majhi defeated Biju Janata Dal candidate Basanti Marandi by a margin of 2,847 votes.

2019 Odisha Legislative Assembly election: Rairangpur
Party	Candidate	Votes	%	±%
BJP	Naba Charan Majhi	60,901	37.31	
BJD	Basanti Marandi	58,054	35.56	
JMM	Ramchandra Murmu	30,456	18.69	
NOTA	None of the above	2,114	1.3	
Majority		2,847	1.75	
Turnout		163,238	69.47	
BJP gain from BJD				

=== 2014 ===
In the 2014 election, Biju Janata Dal candidate Saiba Sushil Kumar Hansdah defeated Bharatiya Janata Party candidate Droupadi Murmu by a margin of 15,556 votes.

2014 Odisha Legislative Assembly election: Rairangpur
Party	Candidate	Votes	%	±%
BJD	Saiba Sushil Kumar Hansdah	51,062	32.72	
BJP	Droupadi Murmu	44,679	22.76	
JMM	Purna Chandra Marndi	28,838	18.48	
INC	Shyam Charan Hansdah	19,075	12.22	
NOTA	None of the above	1,096	0.7	
Majority		15,556	9.96	
Turnout		156,035	74.22	
BJD gain from INC				

=== 2009 ===
In the 2009 election, Indian National Congress candidate Shyam Charan Hansdah defeated Jharkhand Mukti Morcha candidate Purna Chandra Marndi by a margin of 4,602 votes.

2009 Orissa Legislative Assembly election: Rairangpur
Party	Candidate	Votes	%	±%
INC	Shyam Charan Hansdah	24,792	21.53	−
JMM	Purna Chandra Marndi	20,190	17.53	−
BJP	Jaduram Murmu	17,898	15.54	−
NCP	Kashinath Hembram	14,828	12.88	−
Majority		4,602	4.0 (Note: % of total valid votes)	−
Turnout		1,15,288	62.82	−
INC gain from BJP				

=== 2004 ===
In the 2004 election, Bharatiya Janata Party candidate Droupadi Murmu defeated Jharkhand Mukti Morcha candidate Ramchandra Murmu by a margin of 42 votes.

2004 Orissa Legislative Assembly election: Rairangpur
Party	Candidate	Votes	%	±%
BJP	Droupadi Murmu	29,295	32.66	
JMM	Ram Chandra Murmu	29,253	32.62	
INC	Laxman Majhi	22,551	25.14	
Majority		42	0.05	
Turnout		89,689	68.3	
Registered electors		131,315		
BJP hold				

=== 2000 ===
In the 2000 election, Bharatiya Janata Party candidate Droupadi Murmu defeated Indian National Congress candidate Laxman Majhi by a margin of 4568 votes.

2000 Orissa Legislative Assembly election: Rairangpur
Party	Candidate	Votes	%	±%
BJP	Droupadi Murmu	25,110	34.15	
INC	Laxman Majhi	20,542	27.93	
JMM	Braja Mohan Hansdah	10,485	14.26	
Majority		4,568	6.21	
Turnout		74,997	59.81	
Registered electors		125,385		
BJP gain from INC				

== See also ==
- List of constituencies of the Odisha Legislative Assembly
- Mayurbhanj district
