= Bhadav Hansdah =

Indian politician

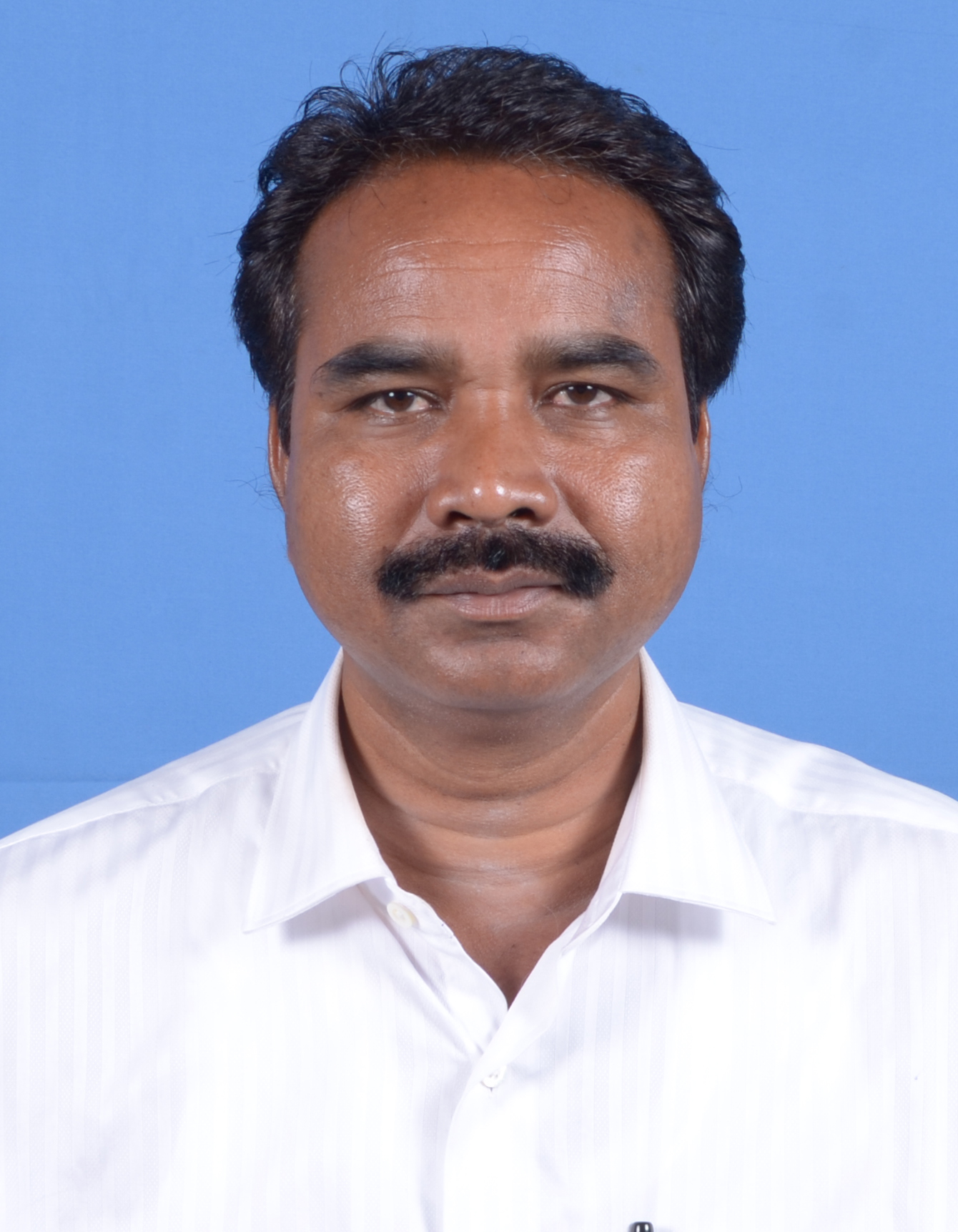

Member of Odisha Legislative Assembly
- Incumbent
- Assumed office 4 June 2024
- Preceded by: Budhan Murmu
- Constituency: Saraskana

Personal details
- Party: Bharatiya Janata Party
- Profession: Politician

Bhadav Hansdah is an Indian politician. He was elected to the Odisha Legislative Assembly from Saraskana as a member of the Bharatiya Janata Party.
