= Rairangpur =

- City
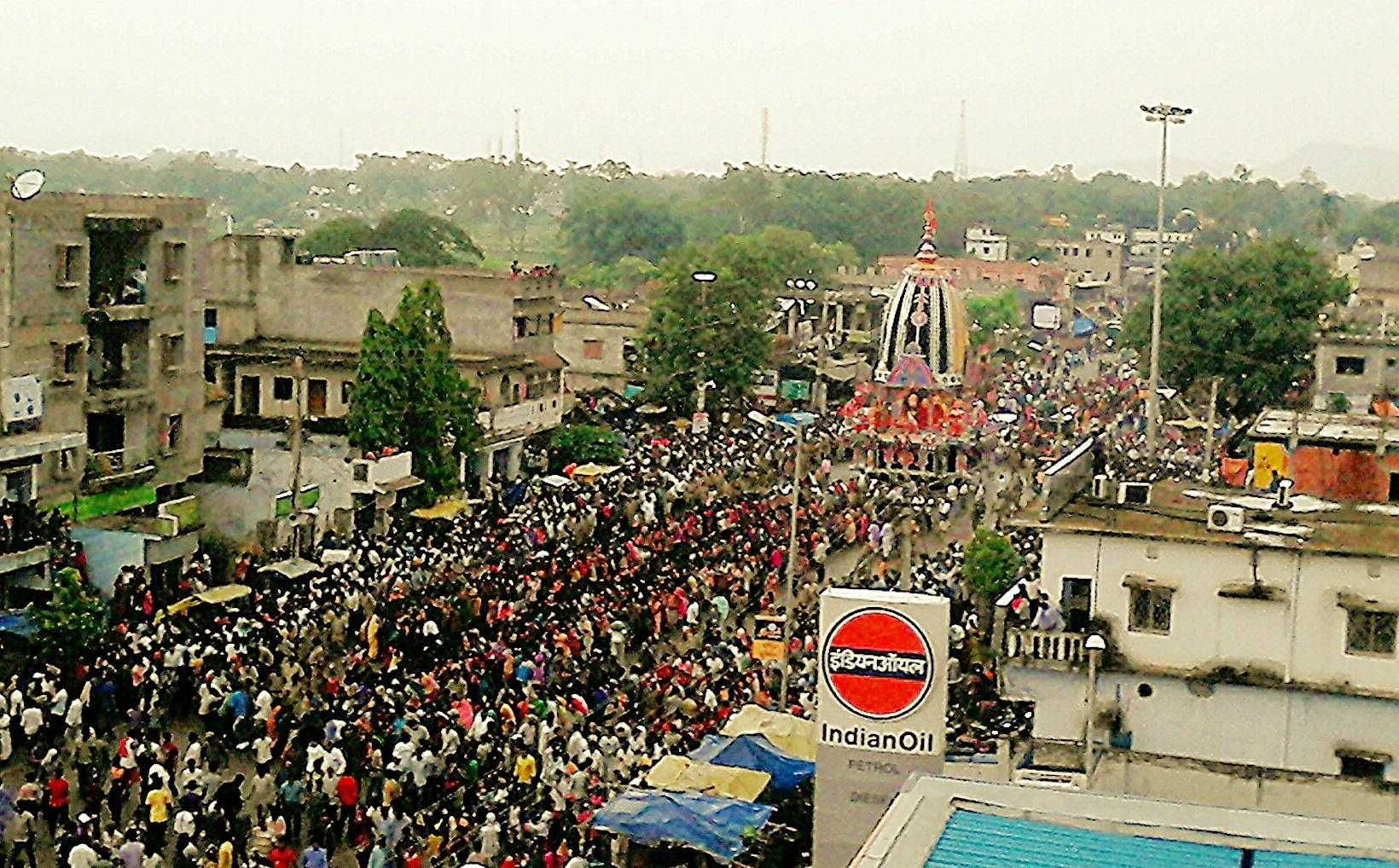
- Nickname: Bamanghati
- Location in Odisha, India Rairangpur (India)
- Coordinates: 22.27°N 86.17°E
- Country: India
- State: Odisha
- District: Mayurbhanj
- Founder: Madhabdas Narendra Mohapatra

Government
  - Type: Municipality
  - Body: Rairangpur Municipality
  - Chairperson: Jalen Naik (BJP)
- Elevation: 248 m (814 ft)

Population (2011)
  - Total: 34,929
- Demonym: Rairangpuria

Languages
  - Official: Odia
- Time zone: UTC+5:30 (IST)
- PIN: 757043
- Telephone code: 06794
- Vehicle registration: ORM-XXXX / OR 11-X-XXXX / OD 11-XXXX
- Website: www.rairangpurmunicipality.org

Rairangpur (Odia pronunciation ରାଇରଙ୍ଗପୁର) is a city and tehsil in the Mayurbhanj district situated on the banks of the river Khadkhai in the state of Odisha, India. It is located 82 kilometres from the district headquarters of Baripada, and about 73 kilometres from Jamshedpur. Rairangpur is the second largest city in the Mayurbhanj district as well as a notable mining area of Odisha, producing iron-ore from the Gorumahisani, Badampahar, and Suleipat mines. The Kharkhai (Suleipat) Dam and the Simlipal Tiger Reserve are among the nearby local attractions.

== Etymology ==
During the rule of the Bhanja dynasty, the town was originally called 'Brahmin Ghati' (ବ୍ରାହ୍ମଣ ଘାଟି), as the town is situated between the Gorumahisani and Budha Rana mountain ranges. The term eventually corrupted over time and became 'Bamanghati', anglicised in various Company maps as 'Baumingaut' or 'Baumeen Gaut'. The town was later renamed to 'Rairangpur' in late 1918, named after Rairangpur Garh.

== Geography ==
Rairangpur is located at 22.27°N 86.17°E. It has an average elevation of 248 m (814 ft). The village mostly consists of shops, rice paddies, and foliage. Roads diverge from NH 220 to areas like Dubulabeda, Sanchampauda, Padmapur and Bhalbadrapur. The villages, buildings, and markets alongside roads are predominantly surrounded by vast swaths of farmland, most of which remains fallow and dormant.

== History ==
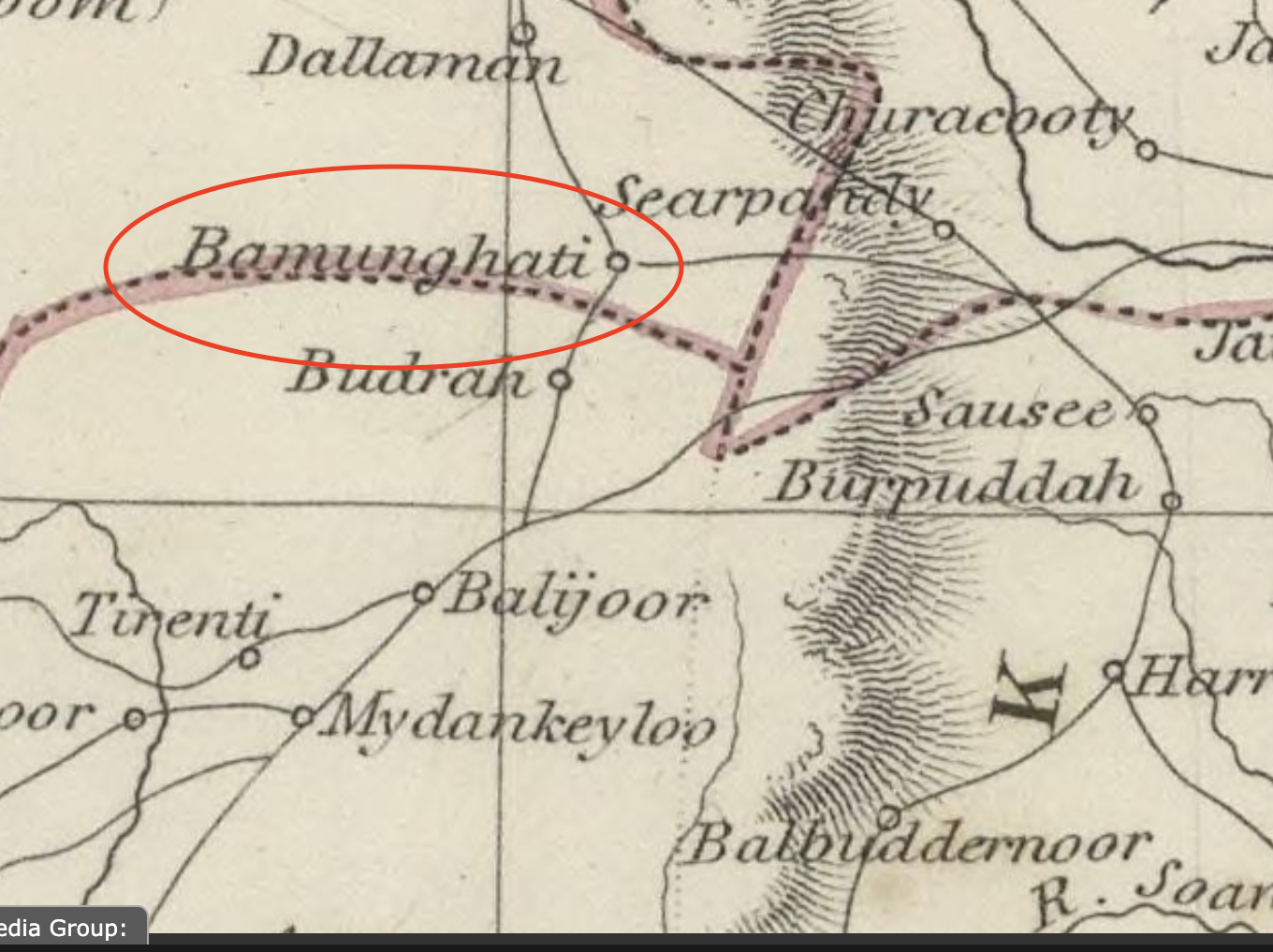
Bamanghaty in Bengal Etc. by Lowry, J.W. and Sharpe, J. 1848

The first mention of Rairangpur (then Bamanghati) is found during Mughal rule in Mayurbhanj, which began in 1592 under the rule of the Subahdar of Bengal Sa'id Khan. According to accounts by Raja Man Singh, there was a fort located at Bamanghati, among other places in the state. However, the earliest map of Bamanghati is found in the Map of Bengal and Bahar, 1781 by James Rennel.

Towards the end of March, 1866, the people of the Bamanghati pargana revolted against the rule of Srinath Bhanja Deo for his inability to handle the Na Anka Durbikhya famine of 1866, which was suppressed by the Maharaja's administration shortly after.

Rairangpur Garh was founded by Madhabdas Narendra Mohapatra in 1878 during the rule of Krushna Chandra Bhanjadeo.

In late 1918, Bamanghati was officially renamed after Rairangpur Garh as Rairangapur.

In 1919, Rairangpur became the headquarters of the Bamanghaty subdivision, replacing Bahalda.

The Mayurbhanj princely state influenced Rairangpur's culture and politics from the 11th century up until its accession to the Dominion of India in 1949.

On 24 April 1960, the Rairangpur Notified Area Council (NAC) was formed with 15 wards.

== Demographics ==
Historical population
Year	Pop.	±%
1961	8,199	—
1971	11,226	+36.9%
1981	15,503	+38.1%
1991	18,097	+16.7%
2001	21,896	+21.0%
2011	34,929	+59.5%
Source: Census of India

According to the 2011 Census of India, Rairangpur has a population of 34,929. Males constitute 52% of the population and females 48%. It has an average literacy rate of 74%, higher than the national average of 59.5%: male literacy is 80%, and female literacy is 68%. Approximately 12% of the total population is under 6 years of age.

== Economy ==
Rairangpur acts as a liaison centre between Jamshedpur in Jharkhand, Durgapur in West Bengal and the iron ore mines in Gorumahisani, Badampahar and Suleipat. The steel factories of Tata and the surrounding areas rely partly on the iron ores extracted from these mines. In addition to freight trains, there is also a DEMU passenger train from Jamshedpur to Badampahar via Rairangpur.

As it is surrounded by hills, iron ore is abundantly found here. The first iron ore mines of Asia were in Gorumahisani, Suleipat and Badampahar (mother mines of Tata Steel). The first ever trial for setting up a "Ferrovanadium Plant" was made by the Maharaja of Mayurbhanj prior to independence. Currently, thousands of tonnes of iron ore are exported here on a daily basis.

The majority of the population is dependent on paddy harvesting (farming) as either their main or alternate source of income. The direct and indirect dependency of the economy of this place is largely influenced by paddy harvesting. The same is again largely dependent on the annual rainfall during May–September. The Kharkhai (Suleipat) Dam and the Bankbal Dam irrigate portions of arable land and assist with the kharif harvesting.

It has the oldest and the largest "Sal Oil Extraction Plant" which has been closed for years. The area suffers due to limited political attention as well as restrained resources and funds allocated for development from government or private sources.

== Climate ==
The area has a tropical savanna climate (Koppen: Aw), with warm weather year round and dry winters and hot and rainy summers (Indian monsoon).

Climate data for Rairangpur, Odisha
Month	Jan	Feb	Mar	Apr	May	Jun	Jul	Aug	Sep	Oct	Nov	Dec	Year
Mean daily maximum °C (°F)	26.0 (78.8)	31.8 (89.2)	36.0 (96.8)	39.0 (102.2)	40.0 (104.0)	37.0 (98.6)	33.0 (91.4)	32.0 (89.6)	32.0 (89.6)	31.0 (87.8)	30.0 (86.0)	25.0 (77.0)	32.7 (90.9)
Mean daily minimum °C (°F)	13.0 (55.4)	19.0 (66.2)	23.0 (73.4)	26.0 (78.8)	28.0 (82.4)	29.0 (84.2)	27.0 (80.6)	26.0 (78.8)	25.0 (77.0)	22.0 (71.6)	20.0 (68.0)	16.4 (61.5)	22.9 (73.2)
Average rainfall mm (inches)	0 (0)	0 (0)	9.1 (0.36)	18.6 (0.73)	36.5 (1.44)	151.9 (5.98)	271.5 (10.69)	297.7 (11.72)	141.4 (5.57)	83.9 (3.30)	2.8 (0.11)	1.9 (0.07)	1,015.3 (39.97)
Source: World Weather online https://www.worldweatheronline.com/lang/en-in/rairangpur-weather-averages/orissa/in.aspx

== Transportation ==
Rairangpur lies on the Tatanagar-Badampahar branch line of Indian Railways.

Daily passenger train runs from Jamshedpur (Tatanagar) to Badampahar.

Two weekly trains, the Badampahar-Rourkela Express runs on Sunday and the Badampahar-Shalimar Express runs on Saturday.

Air conditioned luxurious buses to Bhubaneswar, Cuttack, Keonjhar, Rourkela, Tatanagar and Kolkata are available. Local buses and jeeps are there every fifteen to thirty minutes to all small villages and towns. Important traffic points of the village:

- Bajar Golei Chhak
- Durga Mandapa Chhak
- Raghunath Murmu Chhak

Rairangpur has its local airstrip namely Dandbose Aerodrome. In most cases celebrities land here by their chopper.

== Culture ==
Makar Parba is widely celebrated here, being the most popular festival of Odisha. As Makar comes once in year, a unique atmosphere is created, people wear new clothes and make pitha (rice cake) in their homes, eat it and distribute to their relatives spreading love and affection. Villagers make Tusu (cosmic goddess) represent and them in the nearby Tusu Mela where people gather largely to witness those idols of Tusu.

Other religious festivals: Kumara Purnima, Maha Sibaratri, Raja Parba, Ratha Yatra.

During Ratha Yatra (Chariot Festival), people from all sections of society pull the Ratha (chariot) of Lord Jagannath, Lord Balabhadra and goddess Subhadra to the Mausi Maa Mandir (Aunt's abode) from the Jagannatha Mandir.

Uda Parba or Uda Jatra, is a festival of Lord Shiva celebrated here on 15 April, Pana Sankranti every year.

Most commonly Diwali, Durga Puja, Ganesha Puja and Saraswati Puja is celebrated all over Rairangpur. Popular idols come from Ichinda, Bajar, Kucheiburi, Anladuba, Sakiladihi and Purnaghaty area.

Chhau dance is famous all over the world. Jhumar is the local genre.

Santalis, Mundas, Oraons are the commonly found tribes here. It is a tribal majority region, hence tribal festivals are common here.

== Places of interest ==
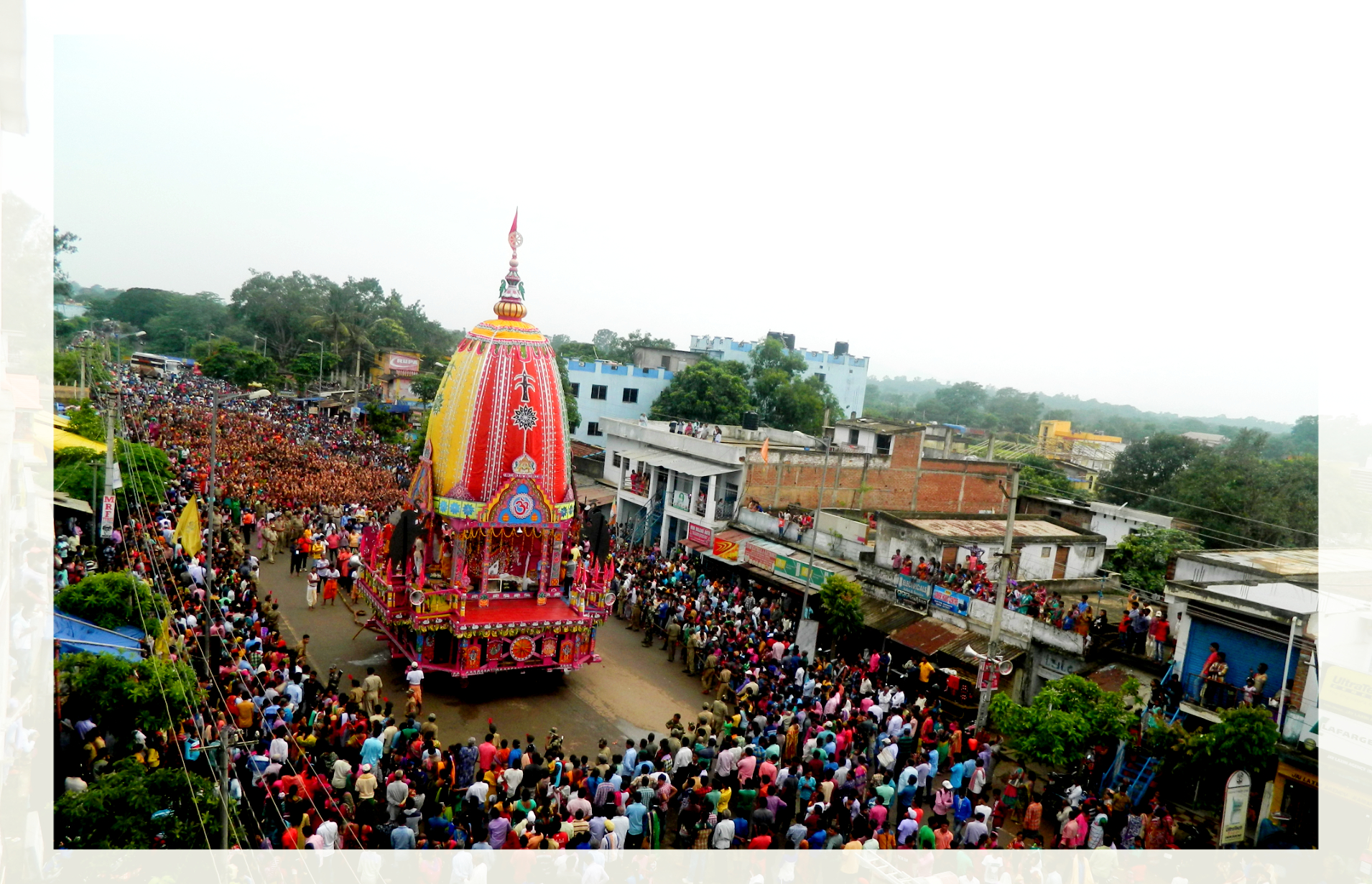
The Rairangpur Ratha Jatra

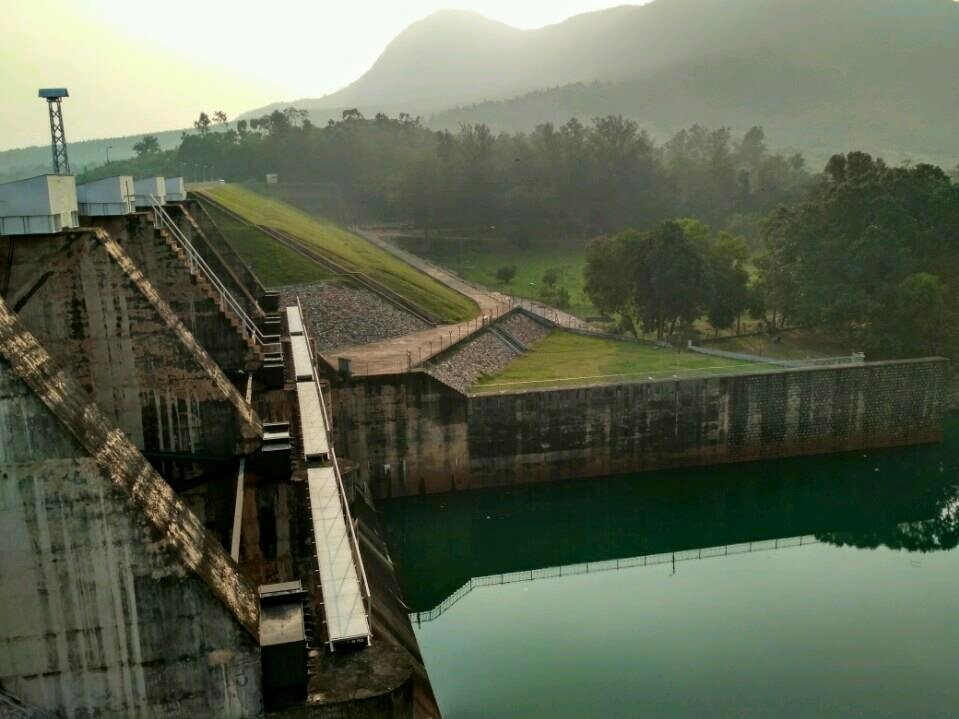
Suleipat Dam

- Jagannatha Temple (ଜଗନ୍ନାଥ ମନ୍ଦିର)
- Hanuman Batika & Bajar (ହନୁମାନ ବାଟିକା ଏବଂ ବଜାର)
- Birsa Munda Park (ବିର୍ସା ମୁଣ୍ଡା ପାର୍କ)
- Indira Gandhi Children's Park (ଇନ୍ଦିରା ଗାନ୍ଧୀ ଚିଲ୍ଡରେନ୍ସ ପାର୍କ)
- Routhkamar Mini Park (ରାଉତକମାର ମିନି ପାର୍କ)
- Gandhi Park (ଗାନ୍ଧୀ ପାର୍କ)
- Asurghati waterfall (ଅସୁରଘାଟି ଜଳପ୍ରପାତ)
- Suleipat Dam (ସୁଳେଇପାଟ ବନ୍ଧ)
- Kharkhai Dam (ଖରାଖାଇ ବନ୍ଧ)
- Bankabal Dam (ବାଙ୍କବାଳ ବନ୍ଧ)
- Simlipal National Park
- Purunia Sibasambhu Temple (ପୁରୁଣିଆ ଶିବଶମ୍ଭୁ ମନ୍ଦିର)
- Raghu Nath Jiu Math (ରଘୁନାଥଜୀଉ ମଠ, ଅଁଳାଦୁବ)
- Badampahar Mines (ବାଦାମପାହାଡ଼ ଖଣି)
- Gorumahisani Mines (ଗୋରୁମହିଷାଣୀ ଖଣି)
- Bodo Bandha (ବଡ଼ ବନ୍ଧ)

== Sports and entertainment ==
Cricket is the most widely played sport in the village. "Deepak Kumar Memorial (DKM)", Mahuldiha organizes a cricket tournament every year. Being the most popular cricket tournament here, teams of different parts of the state and nearby participate and perform their talent. Likewise, "Rairangpur Premier League (RPL)" is also organized at Kacheri Stadium (Rairangpur Stadium).

Sports events organised by various village youth associations shortly after Makar Sankranti are a long-standing tradition that promotes youth participation in athletics. These events are held annually in the month of January and February, and are often accompanied by colorful festivities.

- Park

Children's Park, Kacheri Road Birsamunda Park, Mahuldiha

- VR Center

Odisha now has its first VR Virtual Reality (VR)center at Mind Shift.

== Lifestyle and language ==
Lord Jagannath Temple-Rairangpur

Rairangpurians follow a moderate rural lifestyle, residing in peace and harmony celebrating various religious festivals together.

Odia is the most prevalent language spoken by locals. Hindi is also spoken as a result of trade with neighbouring states like Jharkhand and Chhattisgarh. In addition to Odia and Hindi, Santali is spoken in Santal households and communities.

== Landmarks ==
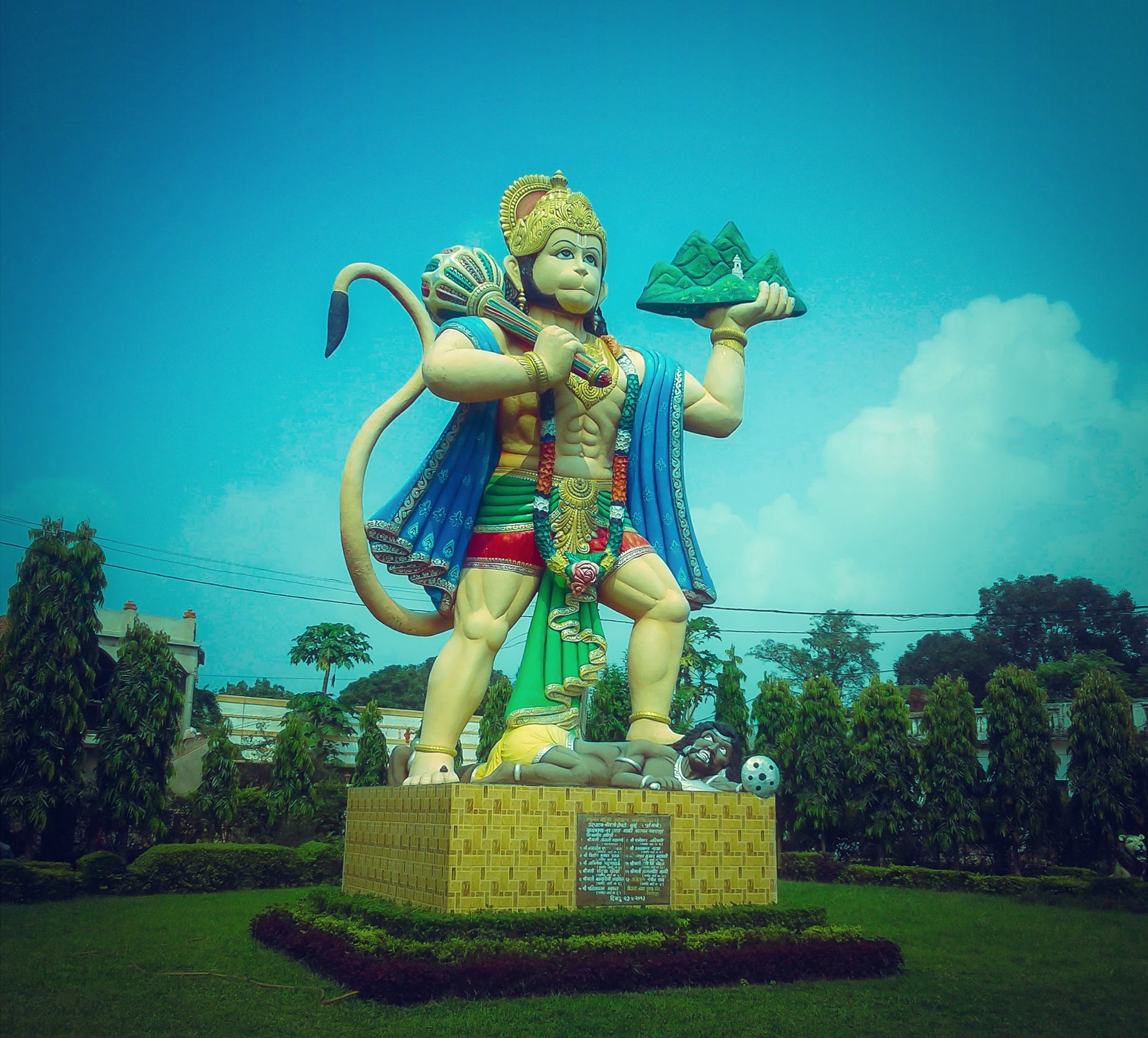
Hanuman Vatika Rairangpur

Most populated areas belong to:

- Mahuldiha
- Anladuba
- Bazar Area
- Baidaposi
- Bikash Nagar
- Banasahi
- Garh
- Ichinda
- Kucheibudhi
- Purnaghaty
- Pichhilighaty
- Sakiladihi
- Thakuranibeda

== Educational institutions ==
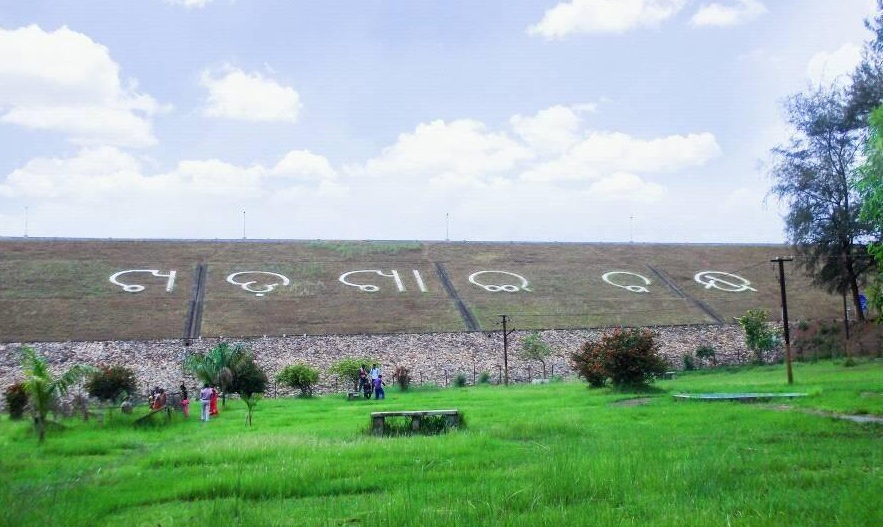
The Kharkhai Dam

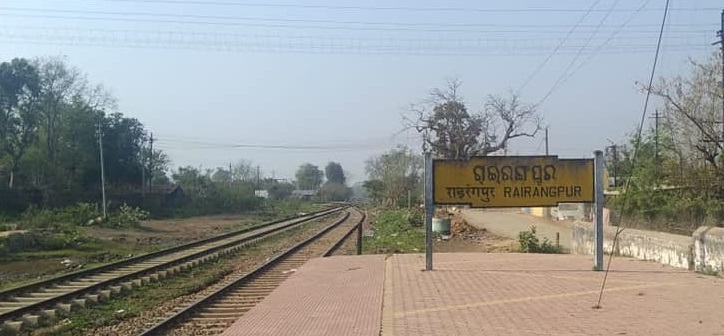
Rairangpur Railway Station

Rairangpur is rapidly growing in educational infrastructure. Some government & private funded educational institutes include :

- Government Boys High School
- Government Girls High School
- Raghu Nath Jiu High School
- SSDD Girls' High School (Kanya Aashram), Rairangpur
- Pichlighaty High School
- Saraswati Shishu Vidya Mandir
- Rairangpur College (North Orissa University)
- Mahila Mahavidyalaya
- Rairangpur ITI (Technical)
- Kerala Public School
- Little Flower School
- Sparsh Public School
- Sunshine English Medium School
- Madina Public School
- Kalinga English Medium School
- Venketeswar Public School
- Fact Computer Education
- Kendriya Vidyalaya
- Technoworld +2 Sc. College
- Odisha Adarsha Vidyalaya, Sanmouda
- Cosmos International School
- Richard Mission Primary School

== Politics ==
The Rairangpur Assembly constituency was formed in 1951. Since then, various politicians have run for election and contributed to the development of the city.

Previous MLAs from this seat were Mr. Naba Charan Majhi of Bharatiya Janata Party (BJP) in 2019, Mr. Saiba Sushil Kumar Hansdah of Biju Janata Dal (BJD) in 2014, Mr. Shyam Charan Hansdah of Indian National Congress (INC) in 2009, Mrs. Droupadi Murmu of Bharatiya Janata Party (BJP) in 2004 and 2000, Laxman Majhi of INC in 1995, Chaitanya Prasad Majhi of Janata Dal (JD) in 1990, Bhabendra Nath Murmu of INC in 1985, Sidhalal Murmu of INC(I) in 1980, Arjun Majhi of Janata Party (JNP) in 1977 and 1974, Sidhalal Murmu of Jharkhand Party (JP) in 1971, Kartick Chandra Majhi of Swatantra Party in 1967, Chandra Mohan Singh of (INC) in 1961, and Haradeb Triya of (INC) in 1957 and 1952.

Mr. Jalen Naik of Bharatiya Janata Party (BJP) is the current MLA from Rairangpur Assembly Constituency,

Mr. Abhishek Pattanaik of Biju Janata Dal (BJD) is the chairperson of the Rairangpur Municipality.

Mr. Naba Charan Majhi of Bharatiya Janata Party (BJP) who was previous MLA won MP elections in 2024 recently and became a Member of Parliament from Rairangpur (Mayurbhanj).

== Notable people ==
- Droupadi Murmu, 15th President of India.
- Raghunath Murmu, creator of Ol Chiki script for writing Santali, born in Dandbose
