= Proto-Munda language =

Reconstructed South Asian proto-language

Proto-Munda
- Reconstruction of: Munda languages
- Region: Possibly Mahanadi River Delta and adjacent coastal plains
- Era: c. 2000 – c. 1500 BCE
- Reconstructed ancestor: Proto-Austroasiatic
- Lower-order reconstructions: Proto-North Munda; Proto-Kharia; Proto-Juang; Proto-Sora-Gorum-Juray; Proto-Gtaʔ; Proto-Gutob-Remo

Proto-Munda is the reconstructed proto-language of the Munda languages of the Indian subcontinent. It has been reconstructed by Sidwell & Rau (2015). According to Sidwell, the Proto-Munda language split from Proto-Austroasiatic in Indochina and arrived on the coast of present-day Odisha (Utkal Plains) around 4000 – 3500 years ago. Based on linguistic evidence, Rau & Sidwell (2019) also propose that Proto-Munda was spoken by a rice and millet-farming culture consisting of indigenous South Asians and Southeast Asian migrants, and the association of proto-Munda speakers with the Neolithic Sankarjang–Golabai Archaeological Complex offshore of the Mahanadi River Delta.

== Phonology ==
The tables below show Proto-Munda consonant and vowel phonemes reconstructed by Rau (2019) and Sidwell & Rau (2014).

=== Consonants ===
		Labial	Alveolar	Palatal	Velar	Glottal
Occlusive	voiceless	*p	*t		*k/*k₂	(*Vˀ)
Occlusive	voiced	*b	*d	*ɟ	*ɡ	
Occlusive	checked	*ˀp	*ˀt	*ˀc	*ˀk	
Occlusive	Nasal	*m	*n	*ɲ	*ŋ	
Fricative			*s			
Approximant			*l	*j		
Trill			*r			

- PAA *h, *w, *c & *ʔ presumably lost, neutralized, or merged with other sounds in proto-Munda.
- *k₂ (Pinnow *q) is a posited reconstructed placeholder for chaotic reflexes that might have happened under presumably k > h > ∅ lenitions (likely through a *χ intermediary).

Gloss	Santali	Kharia	Sora	Bolyu (Pakanic)	Rau & Sidwell	Pinnow
"fish"	hako	kaɖoŋ	əjoː	qɔ⁵³	*k₂	*q
"to bite"	haˀp	hapkaj	op	–	*k₂	*q
"sick"	haso	kosu/kusu	asuː/əsuː	qu⁵⁵	*k₂	*q
"wind"	hojoŋ	kojo	–	qə³¹təŋ⁵⁵	*k₂	*q
"child"	hon	konon	oʔon	qɔn⁵⁵	*k₂	*q
"tiger"	kul	kiɽoʔ	kina	kui⁵³	*k	*k

=== Vowels ===
	Front	Central	Back
Close	*i		*u
Mid	*e	*ə	*o
Open		*a	

- *ə includes regular reflexes in heavy syllables and a chaotic epenthetic schwa in resyllabified onset clusters.

Gloss	Santali	Kharia	Gutob	Proto-Munda	Proto-Austroasiatic
"eye"	mɛ̃ˀt	moˀɖ	moʔ	*məˀt	*matˀ
"to cut"	gɛˀt	gaˀɖ	goɖ	*gəˀt	*gɨtˀ
"mouth"	–	tomoˀɖ	tumoʔ	*tvməˀt	(Khmer *t₁mət > *mɔət)
"raw"	bɛrɛl	borol	burol	*bvrəl	–
"fuel"	sɛŋgɛl	soŋgol	suŋol	*sᵊŋəl	(Palaungic *ŋal)
"tiger"	kul	kiɽoʔ	gikil	*kᵊla	*klaʔ

=== Retroflexes ===
Retroflexes are a major prominent feature of the South Asian linguistic area, and all modern Munda languages possess various sets of retroflexion. In languages with high degrees of contact such as Santali, Korku, Mundari,... retroflex consonants such as plosives often appear in loanwords or have permeated into some native words, while several Sora dialects lack retroflexes altogether. In some cases, Munda stems may have acquired retroflexes naturally via phonological changes similar to those exist in Swedish, Middle Chinese, Vietnamese,... The retroflex sonorants, which reflect contact influence from Dravidian languages, however, are rare and may not be considered phonemic in Munda consonant inventories.

=== Word structure ===
The proto-Austroasiatic canonical structure *C(C)V(C) was completely restructured to *CV(C) shape in proto-Munda. Sidwell & Rau (2019) suggest a scenario that intense language contacts between few Austroasiatic speakers and large number of speakers of unknown language(s) might have occurred immediately after the proto-Munda landfall to Eastern India.

=== Word prominence ===
Though at phrasal level, modern Munda languages exhibit a more South Asian trochaic left-headed pattern, with a pitch contour rising initially and falling at the end of the phrase, the word-level prosodic patterns in many Munda languages have been described as iambic with acoustic correlates of F0, duration, and intensity. Even in longer morphological words _{m}ω (or phrases), the right-headed weak-strong pattern still predominates. In actual speech, the morphological marked words are broken down into sequence of phonological prosodic words (_{p}ω) in an iambic pattern, though the strongest stress falls on the left-most syllable, thus the pattern is {[Right headed]_{p}ω +[Left headed]}_{m}ω. E.g. Santali {[əgú]_{p}ω=[ke-d-kó]_{p}ω=[a=è](_{p}ω)}_{m}ω 'He brought them'. This suggests that Proto-Munda word prosodic structure was likely iambic, which is very similar to other Austroasiatic languages.

== Vocabulary ==
=== Austroasiatic roots ===
The following Proto-Munda lexical proto-forms have been reconstructed by Sidwell & Rau (2015: 319, 340-363). Two asterisks are given to denote the tentative, preliminary state of the proto-language reconstruction.

Gloss	Proto-Munda
belly	**(sə)laɟ
big	**məraŋ
to bite	**kaˀp
black	**kE(n)dE
blood	**məjam
bone	**ɟaːˀŋ
to burn (vt.)	**gEˀp
claw/nail	**rəmAj
cloud	**tərIˀp
cold	**raŋ
die (of a person)	**gOˀj
dog	**sOˀt
to drink (water)	**uˀt, **uˀk
dry (adj./stat.)	**(ə)sAr
ear	**lutur, **luˀt
earth/soil	**ʔOte
to eat	**ɟOm
egg	**(ə)tAˀp
eye	**maˀt
fat/grease/oil	**sunum
feather	**bəlEˀt
fire	**səŋal
fish (n.)	**ka, **kadO(ŋ)
fly (v.)	**pEr
foot	**ɟəːˀŋ
give	**ʔam
hair (of head)	**suˀk
hand	**tiːˀ
to hear/listen	**ajɔm
heart, liver	**(gə)rE, **ʔim
horn	**dəraŋ
I	**(n)iɲ
to kill	**(bə)ɡOˀɟ
leaf	**Olaːˀ
to lie (down)	**gətiˀc
long	**ɟəlƏŋ
louse (head)	**siːˀ
man/husband, person/human	**kOrOˀ
meat/flesh	**ɟəlU(Uˀ)
moon	**harkE, **aŋaj
mountain/hill	**bəru(uˀ)
mouth	**təmOˀt
name	**ɲUm
neck	**kO, **gOˀk
new	**təmI
night	**(m)ədiˀp
nose	**muːˀ
not	**əˀt
one	**mOOˀj
rain	**gəma
red	**ɟəŋAˀt
road, path	**kOrA
root (of a tree)	**rEˀt
sand	**kEˀt
see	**(n)El
sit	**kO
skin	**usal
sleep	**gətiˀc
smoke (n.)	**mOˀk
to speak, say	**sun, **gam, **kaj
to stand	**tənaŋ, **tƏŋgə
stone	**bərƏl, **sərEŋ
sun	**siŋi(iˀ)
tail	**pata
thigh	**buluuˀ
that (dist.)	**han
this (prox.)	**En
thou/you	**(n)Am
tongue	**laːˀŋ
tooth	**gənE
tree	**ɟiːˀ
two	**baːˀr
to walk, go	**sEn
to weave	**ta(aˀ)ɲ
water	**daːˀk
woman/wife	**selA, **kəni
yellow	**saŋsaŋ

Proto-Munda reconstruction has since been revised and improved by Rau (2019).

=== Unknown substrate terms ===
A number of words which have uncertain origins are also found in Zide & Zide (1976)'s reconstruction of proto-Munda cultural terms.

- *sa^{χ}ʔl 'mortar'
- *gaŋ(-)gay 'sorghum'
- *ə-rig' 'small millet' (Panicum miliare)
- *deray 'ragi' (Eleusine coracana)
- *koda^{χ}j 'horsegram' (Macrotyloma uniflorum)
- *rVm 'black gram' (Vigna mungo)
- *u^{χ}li/u^{χ}la 'mango' (Mangifera indica)
- *kaj'-er/*kag'-er 'unripe mango'
- *taŋ 'cow'
- *boŋtel 'buffalo'
- Indian blackberry
- turmeric
- tamarind
- wild date

== Morphosyntax ==
=== Syntactic shift ===
Although the modern Munda languages show a standard head-final subject–object–verb (SOV) order in unmarked phrases, most scholars believe that proto-Munda was head-first, VO like proto-Austroasiatic. The first linguist to noticed this peculiarity, Heinz-Jürgen Pinnow (1925-2016), found strong evidence for a proto-Munda VO order. VO order has been found in compounds, noun incorporation, and verbal morphology in the Sora-Gorum languages, and to a lesser extent in Gtaʔ, Gutob, Remo, Kharia, and Juang. By any given examples, the Munda predicates (including Kherwarian (Santali, Ho,...) and Korku) always show internal head-first, V-P order, with two main overall syntactic orders of transitive verbs: A-V-P and V-P-A, corresponding to Austroasiatic clausal syntaxes SVO and VOS. Most Munda compounds are also head-first and right-branching, with new loan words from Indian languages following the Indian norm of head-final and left-branching.

Remo:

gui-ti
wash-hand
'wash hand'

Sora:

ɲen dʒum-te-ti-n-ai
1SG eat-banana-NPST-INTR-1SG.SUBJ
'I am eating banana'

Juang:

ni-kɔ-ɔɳ-se-na
1PL-RECP-see-PRF-FUT
'We will see each other'

Gorum:

ne-r-ab-sɔˀɟ-ɔm
1SG.SUBJ-NEG-CAUS-learn-2SG.OBJ
'I didn't teach you'

Gtaʔ:

n-ár-aʔ-tʃoŋ=ke
1-NEG-CAUS-eat=PST
'I didn’t feed (s.o.)'

Winfred Lehmann (1973) reviewed,

"If we examine further evidence provided by Pinnow, we note that Munda contains VO characteristics. It has VO order in compounds (Pinnow [1960], 97); it also provides examples of NG [noun-genitive] order and of prefixes. Since the Khmer-Nicobar languages are consistently VO, I assume that it was the Munda languages which were modified syntactically... We may conclude that Proto-Austroasiatic was VO and non-agglutinative in morphological structure."

— Lehmann, 1973:57

Pinnow (1963, 1966) proposed that proto-Munda was SVO and that was the syntax of proto-Austroasiatic, which was also highly synthetic like Munda, whereas he attributed analytic and isolating typological features in modern Mon-Khmer to language contact in the Mainland Southeast Asia linguistic area.

Donegan & Stampe (1983, 2004) argued that proto-Munda was VO but non-agglutinative like its sister languages in Southeast Asia. According to Donegan & Stampe, there are some characteristics of the Munda languages such as head-marking and polysynthesis that are so distinct and attributable to neither Dravidian and Indo-Aryan influence. They believed that Munda synthesis and SOV order were clearly not stimulated just by language contact within the South Asian linguistic area, but by internal restructuring that caused the Munda word prosody to shift its rhythmic patterns from typical Austroasiatic rising, vowel reduction, iambic stressed to falling, vowel harmony, trochaic stressed profile, thus reversed the clausal syntactic structure from VO to OV and triggered word agglutination.

For the reason why the Munda languages keep head-first order in compounds and polysynthetic morphology, Donegan & Stampe (2002) believed that words, like the verb-noun compounds, are more resistant to internal changes of rhythms and ordering than phrases. Donegan & Stampe (2004) carefully stated that their explanation for the Munda rhythm-initiated synthesis drift does not include polysynthesis, and Donegan & Stampe (2002) also termed the Munda polysynthetic morphology as 'idiomatic and (older) morphology.' Stanley Starosta (1967) explained that, during its early formation stage when Munda was still head-first SVO, verb-noun incorporation was facilitated as seen in modern Sora, but then it did a syntactic shift to head-final SOV and added more morphology. The polysynthetic verb phrases thus had become crystalized since that time.

Donegan & Stampe's prediction of Munda synthetic shift caused by change of rhythmic holism is contested by instrumental data of individual languages, which show that Munda prosodic characteristics are not what Donegan & Stampe described.

=== Proto-Munda predicate ===
==== Anderson and Zide (2001, 2007) ====
Gregory D. S. Anderson & Norman Zide (2001, 2007) reconstructed the head-marking bound predicate of Proto-Munda with A-V-P order as following:

Proto-Munda Predicate (Zide & Anderson 2001)
Slot	+4	+3	+2	+1	core	-1	-2	-3
role	SUBJ	NEG	RECIP/CAUS	DERIV	verb stem	PASS/INTR	TRANS/TNS	OBJ

Anderson & Zide (2001), together with van Driem (2001) positioned that the Munda languages are the most morphologically conservative Austroasiatic branch. Van Driem posited that the Austroasiatic languages dispersed eastward from Northeast India to Southeast Asia instead. Michael Witzel (1999) proposed an Austroasiatic homeland further west, in the Panjab region during the Indus Valley Civilization. The current general consensus considers these hypotheses unlikely. Peter Bellwood (2022) states that "the source for the whole Austroasiatic languages is still a mystery."

==== Rau (2020) ====
Felix Rau (2020) concludes that Proto-Munda predicate structure was verb-medial SVO, though he suggests that it might have been less inflected with fewer bound elements, which may cause the Munda predicate development to become divergent later.

Proto-Munda Predicate Clause
Slot	+6	+5	+4	+3	+2	+1	core	-1	-2	-3
role	SUBJ	MOD/ASP	NEG	RECIP	CAUS	DERIV	verb stem	ASP	[other voices]/valency	OBJ
reconstruction		*A *O *Vj *mO	*əˀt *Um	*k₂Əl	*Oˀp	**bə- **tA- **A-		*=lə Perf *=tə Imperf	*n MID *ˀt ACT	
Morphological cognates		Preverbal in Khasi-Palaungic	*ʔət (Proto-Austroasiatic) =m (Standard Khasi) mǝ (Bugan)	kər- (Palaungic, Katuic)	op (Bahnaric) pa- (Pacoh) pʌn (Palaungic) -p- (Khmer pɨn (Khasi)	**bə-, *tA-, *p- (Proto-Austroasiatic)		*las (Proto-Austroasiatic) *lɛʔ (Proto-Bahnaric) li (Mang); Postverbal in Bahnaric, Vietnamese, Khasi-Palaungic, Mon, Aslian, Bugan		

At some points during their early development in South Asia, due to either language contact led to adoptions of South Asian areal features or internal rhythmic changes, the Munda languages presumably made a syntactic shift from head-first, prefixing SVO to head-final, suffixing SOV. Proto-North Munda restructured all prefixes and prepositions into suffixes. The situation is quite different in South Munda languages, especially Juang, Gtaʔ, and Sora-Gorum, where the original proto-Munda prefix slots are well-preserved, but later additional developments of their predicates are mostly suffixes or enclitics.

=== Noun phrase (NP) order ===
Proto-Munda NPs appear to follow proto-Austroasiatic order: [quantifiers] noun [modifiers], whereas modern Munda languages, following South Asian norms, have restructured NP moderately by placing [modifiers] to precede the head noun, while keeping the original proto-Austroasiatic NUM CLF N order like Bahnaric, Vietic, Katuic, Aslian, Nicobarese, and Khasian.

=== Origin of Munda referent indexation ===
Munda pronominal affixes and clitics are usually the reduced, derivable forms of pronouns. Based on reconstructed proto-Munda pronouns by Pinnow (1966), he argued that the Munda verb gradually attached to its free pronouns and became pronominalized. The evidence suggests that the development of pronominalization in Munda occurred separately and varying among the Munda subgroups. Thus, Munda pronominalized indexation possibly has parallels with some Eastern Austroasiatic languages in the Aslian and Katuic, where prosodically weak resumptive pronouns are used to mark agreement with subjects/agents, but not with objects. The Khasian languages also mark agreement with gender of subject, but not with person and number. Object and patient indexation in Munda were secondary developments.

In the past, some linguists suggested that some Tibeto-Burman languages in the Himalayas like the Eastern Kiranti languages got their pronominalization from either Munda or Indo-European languages to explain the remarkable similarity between Munda and Tibeto-Burman. However, since the reconstruction of proto-Munda pronouns by Pinnow (1965) and proto-Tibeto-Burman person affixes by van Driem (1993), it appears that the pronominalization of two groups are inherently different and unrelated to each other in terms of functions and structures, and that two groups developed their own referent indexation system independently. Bauman (1975) articulated that verbal pronominalization is a native trait of Tibeto-Burman itself rather than being influenced by Munda. Pronominalized Tibeto-Burman languages have elaborate morphosyntactic case-marking system on nominals to show alignments between arguments, i.e. ergative-absolutive or nominative-accusative, a feature that many Munda languages fundamentally lack or not well-developed. Today the view of Munda substratum on Tibeto-Burman has been abandoned by linguists.

=== Noun incorporation ===
According to Anderson (2014, 2017, 2021), Munda syntactic noun incorporation is very archaic and may be the oldest feature of Austroasiatic morphology, with cognates attested in across every subgroup, but the status of noun incorporation in proto-Munda is still difficult to determine. Rau notes that "it is possible that some sort of incorporation was already present in proto-Munda and worked along the lines attested in modern Sora."

== Pre-Proto-Munda ==
Rau & Sidwell (2019) advocate that the "Pre-Proto-Munda" (immediate ancestral to proto-Munda) language had emerged in Mainland Southeast Asia sometimes after 4,500 years ago. A small number of those Pre-Proto-Munda speakers, mostly male, presumably made their way to India by means of a maritime route across the Bay of Bengal to the Mahanadi River Delta, by 3,500 years ago. The following interactions with a distinctive local South Asian population then gave rise to proto-Munda and the Munda branch of the Austroasiatic family, supported by archaeological and genetic studies. Proto-Munda may represent the intermediate morphosyntactic development stage between pre-Proto-Munda and the modern Munda languages that culminated to the radical differences in morphosyntax between Munda and other languages in the Austroasiatic phylum.

While the Munda Maritime Hypothesis (MMH) marshals multiple lines of argumentation—linguistic, archaeological, geographical, and genetic—the main thrust is that the distribution of Munda languages is best explained by dispersals upstream and outward from the Mahanadi-Brahmani Delta (MBD). Assuming that the MBD was not itself the origin point of AA, a locus at the MBD is quite significant; the only other AA branch present in mainland India, Khasian, shows clear affiliation with the Palaungic language of Myanmar (Sidwell 2011) such that we can confidently suppose a pre-Khasian migration through Upper Burma to the Bhramaputra Valley on the way to Meghalaya. Munda seems to have appeared on the east coast of India—tentatively correlating with the Eastern Wetland Tradition dated by archaeology to around 3500 BP—without signs of connections to any AA groups in India or immediately east of the subcontinent. In fact, the most striking lexical connections are between Munda and AA language of Indo-China, especially among the pronouns and numerals of Vietic and Bahnaric, suggesting a direct connection to the Vietnam coast.

Anderson (2022, 2024) outlines some basic characteristics of pre-Proto-Munda language:

- Maintained many older AA features
- Had verb-initial or/and verb-medial syntax
- Mild degree of verb-noun stem combining
- A case prefix on pronouns

The transition from pre-Proto-Munda to proto-Munda must have been triggered due to intense contact with a now lost language/group of languages that did not share typological profile with the majority of modern South Indian languages (Indo-Aryan-Dravidian).

== See also ==
- Proto-Austroasiatic language
