= Mảng people =

Mảng
Total population
- 5,150

Regions with significant populations
- Vietnam 4,650 (2019); China (Yunnan)

Languages
- Mảng (Vietnamese or Chinese as second languages)

Religion
- Traditional (polytheistic) • Buddhism

Related ethnic groups
- Khmu, Palaung

The Mảng (Chinese: 莽人; pinyin: Mángrén; Vietnamese: Mảng) are an ethnic group living primarily in Vietnam and China.

They are one of Vietnam's 54 officially recognized ethnic groups. They mainly reside in Hua Bum and Nậm Ban communes of Nậm Nhùn district of Lai Châu province. The Mảng population according to the 2009 Population and Housing Census was about 3,700 people.

There are also between 500 and 700 Mảng living in Jinping Miao, Yao, and Dai Autonomous County, southern Honghe Hani and Yi Autonomous Prefecture, bordering Vietnam's Lai Châu Province to the south and Lào Cai Province to the southeast, in southern Yunnan province, southwest China. In China, the Mang were formerly officially termed an undistinguished nationality, but in 2009, with approval from the State Ethnic Affairs Commission and the Yunnan provincial government, the Mang people were inaccurately classified as members of the Blang ethnic group, although their autonym "Mang" was retained. In 1959, the Mang, who had long lived and farmed in the primeval forests of Jinping County, Yunnan Province, were mobilized by the government to settle and settle in the forests. Gradually, four natural villages—Nanke Xinzhai, Pinghe Zhongzhai, Pinghe Xiazhai, and Leigongdaniu—were established in Jinshuihe Town, Jinping County, with a population of over 600 (as of 2003)。

In Laos in the early 20th century, some Mang lived in the mountainous northern part of Phongsaly province, with unknown villages and population details.

The Mảng language is classified as an independent branch of the Austroasiatic language family.

== Culture ==
The Mảng practiced chin-tattooing for women who reach puberty. In the past, they were nicknamed "Yellow Leaf People" due to their slash and burn nomadic lifestyle. They used forest leaves to build temporary houses. When the leaves turned yellow, they would move to another place.

== See also ==
- Bolyu language
- Bugan language
- Pakanic languages
- List of ethnic groups in Vietnam
