= Bolyu =

Total population
- >2,400

Regions with significant populations
- China (Longlin County, Guangxi and Yunnan)

Languages
- Bolyu (frequently not)

Religion
- Traditional

Bolyu is one of the unrecognized ethnic groups in China. Bolyu language (autonym: pɔ˧lju˩˧; Chinese: 巴琉语, 布流语; also known as Paliu, Palyu, or Lai 俫语, 徕语) is an Austroasiatic language of the Pakanic branch (Sidwell 1995). It is unwritten and moribund.
