= Unrecognized ethnic groups in China =

A number of ethnic groups of the People's Republic of China are not officially recognized. Taken together, these groups (simplified Chinese: 未识别民族; traditional Chinese: 未識別民族; pinyin: wèi shíbié mínzú) would constitute the twentieth most populous ethnic group of China. Some scholars have estimated that there are over 200 distinct ethnic groups that inhabit China, compared to 56 groups that are officially recognized. There are in addition small distinct ethnic groups that have been classified as part of larger ethnic groups that are officially recognized. Some groups, like the Hui of Xinjiang with the Hui of Fujian, are geographically and culturally separate, except for the shared belief of Islam. Han Chinese, being the world's largest ethnic group, has great diversity within it. For example, in Gansu, Han individuals may have genetic traits from the assimilated Tangut civilization. Although they are indigenous to Hainan island and do not speak a Chinese language, the Lingao (Ong-Be) people near the capital (8% of the population) are counted as Han Chinese.

== List of ethnic groups ==
English Name	Simplified Chinese and Traditional Chinese	Mandarin Pinyin	Population	Classified in census as .....	Territory	Details
Bunu	布努人	Bùnǔrén	700,000	Yao	Guangxi	Officially classified as ethnic Yao.
Chuanqing	穿青人	Chuānqīngrén	670,000	Han	Liupanshui/Zhijin County, Bijie Prefecture, Guizhou	The Chuanqings view themselves as a distinct group of people despite being descendants of Han Chinese military servicemen. Most of them live in Anshun area of Guizhou province. Other locals call the Chuanqings "Da Jiao Ban" (Big Foot) or "Da Xiuzi" (Big Sleeves). Uniquely, they worship a god called Wuxian (五显).
Lingao	临高人 臨高人	Língāorén	500,000	Han or Zhuang	Hainan	Speakers of the Be languages. Some have chosen to register as Zhuang, while the majority of them registered as Han.
Waxiang	瓦乡人 瓦鄉人	Wǎxiāngrén	400,000	Han	Yuanling County, Yongding, Yongshun County of Hunan	Many of the Waxiang people are designated as Miao, while some are designated as Tujia or Han.
Torghut	土尔扈特人 土爾扈特人	Tǔěrhùtèrén	150,000	Mongols	Xinjiang	
Gyalrong	嘉绒人 嘉絨人	Jiāróngrén	120,000	Tibetan	Ngawa Tibetan and Qiang Autonomous Prefecture, Sichuan	Speakers of the Gyalrong language related to Qiang.
Limin	里民人	Lǐmínrén	100,000	Li	Anshun/Qianxinan Buyei and Miao Autonomous Prefecture, Guizhou	Part of the Chuanqing people. Not related to the Li people of Hainan.
Gejia	𱎼家人	Géjiārén	50,000	Miao	Qiandongnan Prefecture, Guizhou	
Mosuo	摩梭人	Mósuōrén	50,000	Nakhi	Sichuan, Yunnan	Consisting of a population of approximately 50,000, many of them live in the Yongning region, around Lugu Lake, in Labai, in Muli, and in Yanyuan. Although the Mosuo are culturally distinct from the Nashi, the Chinese government places them as members of the Nashi minority. The Nashi are about 320,000 people spread throughout different provinces in China. Their culture has been documented by indigenous scholars Lamu Gatusa, Latami Dashi, Yang Lifen, and He Mei.
Äynu	艾努人	Àinǔrén	50,000	Uyghur	Moyu/Hetian/Luopu/Shache/Shule/Yingjisha Counties, Hotan Prefecture, Xinjiang	Ethnically and linguistically distinct, speak Äynu language (Siberian Turkic subfamily) and adhere Shia Islam (Alevism). Not related to the Ainu people of Hokkaido and Sakhalin.
Caijia	蔡家人	Càijiārén	40,000	Han or Bai	Guizhou	Caijia people's language is said to be a relative of the Bai language.
Muxi	木佬人	Mùlǎorén	30,000	Yi	Majiang/Kaili/Huangping (Qiandongnan Miao and Dong Autonomous Prefecture), Duyun/Fuquan (Qiannan Buyei and Miao Autonomous Prefecture), Guizhou and Chun'an County, Zhejiang	Their language Muyu belongs to the Kra language group, close to the proverb, but due to similarities to the Gelao they are being classified into the Yi.
Mojia	莫家人	Mòjiārén	20,000	Bouyei	Libo County, Qiannan Buyei and Miao Autonomous Prefecture, Guizhou	They speak the Mak language (Kam-Sui).
Baima	白马人 白馬人	Báimǎrén	15,000	Tibetan	Jiuzhaigou, Sichuan and Wen County, Gansu	The Baima people are said to be the descendants of Di (氐) people.
Utsul	回辉人 回輝人	Huíhuīrén	8,500	Hui	Hainan	The Utsuls are thought to be descendants of Cham refugees who fled their homeland of Champa in Vietnam.
Khmu	克木人	Kèmùrén	7,000	Bulang	Xishuangbanna, Yunnan	
Guge	古格人	Gǔgérén	5,000	Hui (Qinghai), Tibetan (Yunnan)	Hualong Hui Autonomous County, Haidong Prefecture, Qinghai, Deqen/Weixi Counties, Diqing Tibetan Autonomous Prefecture, Yunnan and Lhasa, Tibet Autonomous Region	It is distributed in Hualong Hui Autonomous County of Qinghai Province, Shangri-La, Deqin, Weixi County, and Lhasa City of Tibet Autonomous Region in the Diqing Tibetan Autonomous Prefecture of Yunnan Province. The Guge people are culturally coordinated and adapted to be compatible with and preserve multi-ethnic culture. Suddenly retain the characteristics of the Hui culture, forming a unique nation.
Akha	阿卡人	Ākǎrén	6,000	Hani	Jinghong/Jinghan/Qilong town (Jinghong County), Bulangshan town (Menghai County) and Qilun town (Mengla County), Xishuangbanna Dai Autonomous Prefecture, Yunnan	The Akha claimed to be "over gram", and Akha was the name of the Yi people (meaning "slaves").
Bisu	毕苏人 畢蘇人	Bìsūrén	6,000	Some are classified as Lahu while those who live in Menghai County are counted as "undistinguished nationalities"	Menghai County, Xishuangbanna Dai Autonomous Prefecture, Yunnan	
Lemo	勒墨人	Lēimòrén	7,000	Bai and Lisu	Lushui County, Nujiang Lisu Autonomous Prefecture, Yunnan	They are results of intermarriage between Tai Mao (Dehong Dai/Shan) and Lisu peoples.
Altaians	阿尔泰人 阿爾泰人	Ā'ěrtàirén	several thousand	Mongolian	Altay Prefecture of Xinjiang	
Yamato	大和人	Dàhérén	4000 (in total) (Note: This count does not include all Japanese people in China (such as those who arrived after 1945), but only those who have resided in China since 1945.)	Han	Across Jilin, Inner Mongolia, and Liaoning	Leftovers of Japanese settlers that remained in China after the Second Sino-Japanese War, primarily women and orphaned children. Many declare themselves as Han in Chinese censuses due to having mostly assimilated into Chinese society.
Ryukyu	琉球人	Liúqiúrén	4000 (in total)	Han or sometimes Gaoshan	Across Jilin, Inner Mongolia, and Liaoning	Leftovers of Japanese settlers that remained in China after the Second Sino-Japanese War, primarily women and orphaned children. Many declare themselves as Han in Chinese censuses due to having mostly assimilated into Chinese society.
Tuvans	图瓦人 圖瓦人	Túwǎrén	3,900	Mongolian	Far north of Xinjiang	Only around 2,000 Tuvan speakers left.
Bugan	布赓人 布賡人	Bùgēngrén	2,700	Yi	Southern Guangnan (广南) and northern Xichou (西畴), Yunnan	Speakers of the Bugan language.
Pakan	布赓人 布賡人	Bùgēngrén	2,000	Yi	Wennan, Xiqiao. Wenshan, Yunnan	
Buyang	布央人	Bùyāngrén	2,000	Yao, Zhuang	Wenshan Prefecture, Yunnan and Napo County, Guangxi	They are closely related to the Laha, Qabiao, Gelao, and Lachi.
Deng	僜人	Chēngrén	2,000	May be classified as Tibetan	Zayu County, Linzhi (Nyingchi), Tibet Autonomous Region	They speak various Mishmi languages (including Kaman/Miju and Idu Mishmi language).
Bolyu	巴琉人	Bāliúrén	1,800		Longlin County, Guangxi	Also known as Lai.
Kunge	昆格人	Kūngérén	1,656 (338 households)	Blang	Jinghong County, Xishuangbanna Dai Autonomous Prefecture, Yunnan	The custom of the Kunge is different from that of the general Blang. The unique special day has the Dragon and the Dragon Festival. The Dragon Column is an iron festival. The time is in the solar calendar in February. During the festival, you must kill the cows, burn the bonfire, and worship the ancestors.
Bajia	八甲人	Bājiǎrén	1,500	Blang and Yi	Yu'a/Yucha Township, Menghai County, Xishuangbanna Dai Autonomous Prefecture, Yunnan	Distributed in Menghai County, Xishuangbanna Dai Autonomous Prefecture, Yunnan Province. Those who mixed with Blang are being classified as Blang peoples while those who unmixed are being classified as Yi peoples (this happened on 2011 after approval by Chinese National Civil Affairs Commission and the Yunnan Provincial Government).
Fuyu Kyrgyz	富裕柯克孜人 富裕柯克孜人	Fùyù Kēkèzīrén	1,400	Kyrgyz	Fuyu County, Heilongjiang	Ethnically and linguistically distinct from Kyrgyz, closely related to the ancient Yenisei Kyrgyz and modern Khakas in Siberia.
Keriya	克里雅人	Kèlǐyǎrén	1,300	Uyghur	Yutian/Minfeng County, Hotan Prefecture, Xinjiang	The Keriya people are said to be descendants of the Tibet Aliguge dynasty. Another group are said to be desert indigenous people living there. The natural environment determines the lifestyle of the Keriya people in the deep Taklimakan Desert. It still retains the simple and pure folk customs. Culture and a more primitive way of life. Most of them lived together for generations. The elderly at home are the most respected elders. The tribes rarely marry outsiders. They are called "the primitive tribes in the desert".
Manmi	曼咪人	Mànmīrén	1,000	Blang	Jinghong County, Xishuangbanna Dai Autonomous Prefecture, Yunnan	Manmi people have their own language, Man Met which belongs to the Mon-Khmer (Austroasiatic) language group, and the Manmi people's housing, costumes, religious beliefs, and festivals are similar to the Yi people, but the ethnic group is classified as the Blang ethnic group. Now, Manmi people hope to be counted as an independent nation.
Kaifeng Jews	开封犹太人 開封猶太人	Kāifēng Yóutàizú	600 – 1,000	Hui or Han	Kaifeng, Henan	Descendants of Jewish silk road traders.
Kangjia	康家人	Kāngjiārén	500–600	Hui	Jainca (Jianzha) County, Huangnan Tibetan Autonomous Prefecture, Qinghai	The Kangjia people have their own language, Kangjia language. It belongs to the Mongolian language group. The lifestyle is mixed with the Hui and Tu nationalities. Therefore, the Kangjia peoples now consider themselves to be an independent nationality, different from the surrounding people.
Mang	莽人	Mǎngrén	568	Blang	Xishuangbanna Dai Autonomous Prefecture, Yunnan	
Tomao	托茂人	Tuōmàorén	500	Hui	Yanqi Hui Autonomous County, Bayingolin Mongol Autonomous Prefecture, Xinjiang and Zhidoi County, Yushu Tibetan Autonomous Prefecture, Qinghai	Muslim minority distributed in Qinghai and Xinjiang, with its own unique customs, using Tomo language (a Mongolian mixed Arabic and Persian vocabulary).
Qabiao	布标人 布標人	Bùbiāozrén	302	Yi	Malipo County, Yunnan	Also known in Vietnam as the Pu Peo (普標).
Laopin	老品人	Lǎopǐnrén	233 (in 52 households)	May be classified as Dai	Menghai County, Xishuangbanna Dai Autonomous Prefecture, Yunnan	The Lao Ping ethnics call themselves "old products", also known as "card products". Old people retain their own language, such as eating for "Tangza", housing for "crowding", and fluent slang. The old-fashioned housing is a Chinese-style bungalow. A unique original religion, with temples and godless statues, is held every year in the whole village.
Laomian	老缅人 老緬人	Lǎomiǎnrén	233 (in 52 households)	Lahu	Menghai County, Xishuangbanna Dai Autonomous Prefecture, Yunnan	The Laomian has nothing to do with the Burmese. The Laomian people is a cross-border ethnic group distributed in the border areas of China, Thailand, Myanmar, and Laos. In China, Laojia Dazhai in Zhutang Township of Mula County and Miaohai Village in Menghai County of Mianhai County are the main settlements.
Daman	达曼人 達曼人	Dámànrén	200	Tibetan	Gyirong County, Shigatse Prefecture, Tibet	They are popularly believed to be descendants of the Nepalese Gurkha army.
Caizu	菜族人	Càizúrén	170 (in 32 households)	Han	Unknown	
Ili Turks	土尔克人, 土爾克人	Tǔěrkèrén	120	Uzbek, Uyghur	Ili Kazakh Autonomous Prefecture, Northern Xinjiang	Ethnically and linguistically distinct from Uyghurs.
Ongkor	翁阔人 翁闊人	Wēngkuòrén	20	Evenki	Yining County, Ili Kazakh Autonomous Prefecture, Xinjiang	It is said that Ongkor is the smallest ethnic group in China. The 1993 survey showed that there were only 20 people.
Tanka	疍家人 疍家人	Dànjiārén		Han	Guangdong, Fujian, Hainan	Thought to have Baiyue origins. Traditionally boat people who lived by the sea, they were sometimes referred to as "sea gypsies".
Dolan	刀朗人	Dāolǎngrén		Uyghur	Awat County, Xinjiang	
Kucong	苦聪人 苦聰人	Kǔcōngrén		Lahu	Yunnan	

== See also ==
- Ethnic minorities in China
- Ethnic groups in Chinese history
- History of the Jews in China
- List of unrecognized ethnic groups of Guizhou
