= Mảng language =

Austroasiatic language of Vietnam and China

Mảng
- Native to: Vietnam, China
- Ethnicity: Mảng
- Native speakers: (4,900 (2007 – 2009 census) 3,200 cited 1999 – 2007? census)
- Language family: Austroasiatic: Mảng

Language codes
- ISO 639-3: zng
- Glottolog: mang1378
- ELP: Mang

Mảng (autonym: [maŋ35]; Chinese: 莽语; pinyin: Mǎngyǔ) is an Austroasiatic language of Vietnam and China. It is spoken mainly in Lai Châu Province, Vietnam and across the border in Jinping County, China. It was first documented only in 1974.

In China, the Mảng people are also called Chaman (岔满), Abi (阿比), Mengga (孟嘎), Bageran (巴格然), and Mo (莫). They are officially classified by the Chinese government as ethnic Bulang (布朗族) (Jinping County Gazetteer 1994).

The issue regarding the classification of Mang remains unresolved, as the language lacks a clear set of shared innovations with other Austroasiatic branches such as Palaungic or Pakanic.

== Distribution ==
In Lai Châu Province, Vietnam, Mảng is spoken by 2,200 people in the districts of Sìn Hồ, Mường Tè, Phong Thổ, and in other nearby areas, including in Nậm Ban Township, Sìn Hồ District, Lai Châu Province. In China, Mảng speakers numbered 606 people in 1999. The Mảng of China claim to have migrated from Vietnam in recent times. Gao's (2003) Mảng data is from Xinzhai (新寨), Nanke Village (南科村), and Jinshuihe Township (金水河镇).

The Jinping County Gazetteer from the Republic of China period lists 12 Mảng villages: Gongdaniu (公打牛), Luowuzhai (落邬寨), Pinghe (坪河, in Xiazhai 下寨, Zhongzhai 中寨, Shangzhai 上寨), Hetouzhai (河头寨), Guanmuzhai (管木寨), Naxizhai (纳西寨), Bianjiezhai (边界寨), Longshuzhai (龙树寨), Caoguoping (草果坪), and Nanke (南科).

== Phonology ==
=== Vowels ===
Mang vowels
	Front			Central		Back	
	unrounded	short	rounded	unrounded	short	rounded	short
Close	i	ĭ	y	ɨ	ɨ̆	u	ŭ
Mid	e	ĕ	ø	ɤ	ɤ̆	o	ŏ
Open	ɛ	ɛ̆	œ	a	ă	ɔ	ɔ̆
Diphthong	iə			ɯə		uə	

Diphthongs iə and ɯə are only found in closed syllables, while ua are more common in open syllables.

=== Consonants ===
Onsets
		Labial	Alveolar		Palatal	Velar	Glottal
		Labial	central	sibilant	Palatal	Velar	Glottal
Stop/ Affricate	voiceless	p	t		c	k	ʔ
Stop/ Affricate	implosive	ɓ	ɗ				
Fricative	voiceless		θ	s			h
Fricative	voiced	v			ʑ	ɣ	
Nasal		m	n		ɲ	ŋ (ŋ̊)	
Approximant			l r		j		

Codas
	Bilabial	Alveolar	Palatal	Velar
Plosive	p	t		k
Nasal	m	n		ŋ
Approximant	(w)	l	j	

=== Suprasegmentals (tone, register) ===
Mang is described as having five tones distributed in unchecked sonorant-final syllables and another two tones in checked syllables.

== Lexicon ==
=== Numerals ===
The basic cardinal numbers from 1 to 1000 (transcribed in IPA) are:

1	măk⁶
2	ʑɯəi²
3	pe³
4	pun²
5	hăn²
6	ʑɔ̆m²
7	tăm¹ py³
8	tăm¹ ham²
9	tăm¹ θin²
10	ʑi³ mɛ⁴
100	ran⁵~ʑan⁵
1000	păn⁵

=== Vocabulary comparison ===
Comparison of some basic vocabulary words in Mảng with other branches of Austroasiatic:

Gloss	Mảng	proto-Waic / proto-Palaungic	Khmu	Bolyu	Bugan	proto-Vietic	Mon / Old Mon
‘I’	ʔuː⁴	*ʔɨʔ / *ʔɔːʔ	ʔoʔ	ʔaːu⁵⁵	ɔ³¹	*soː	ʔoa / ʔɔj
‘water’	ʑum¹	*rʔom / *ʔoːm	ʔom	nde⁵³	nda²⁴	*ɗaːk	dac / ɗaik
‘two’	ʑɨəj⁴	*ləʔar / *ləʔaːr	baːr	mbi⁵⁵	bi³¹	*haːr	ba / ɓar
‘fire’	ɲɛ²	*ŋɒl / *ŋal	pʰrɨə	mat³³	a̠u³¹	*guːs	kəmot / –
‘blood’	haːm¹	*hnam / *snaːm	maːm	saːm⁵³	sa⁴⁴	*ʔasaːmʔ	chim / chim
‘five’	han²	*phɒn / *pəsan	(Tay Hat sɔːŋ)	me³¹	mi⁴⁴	*ɗam	pəsɔn / sun
‘eye’	mat⁷	*ʔŋaj / *ˀŋaːj	mat	mat⁵³	mɛ̱³³	*mat	mòt / mɔt

=== Reconstruction ===
The table below lists some reconstructed Proto-Mang forms by Gehrmann (2023) and their modern reflexes.

Gloss	Sìn Hồ Mang	Xinzhai Mang	Proto-Mang	note
mouth	ŋ² tø⁵	mɤŋ³¹ tø³⁵	*ʔŋtøᴬ	Proto-Vietic *t-huːs 'to blow'
throat	ŋ² ʑɔ̆ŋ³	ŋɤ³¹ gɣɔŋ⁵⁵	*ʔŋrɔŋᴬᵛ	Kammu Yuan troːŋ 'throat'
nose	ŋ¹ my¹	lɤŋ⁵⁵ my⁵¹	*myᴮ	Proto-Austroasiatic *muːɕ 'nose'
seven	tăm¹ py³	tɐm³¹ py⁵⁵	*tmpyᴬᵛ	Proto-Austroasiatic *pəɕ 'seven'
ox	lø⁵	ma³¹ lø³⁵	*løᴬ	Proto-Vietic *c-luː 'buffalo'; Old Mon *ɟlɔw 'buffalo'
bird	θɤ̆m⁵	θɔm³⁵	*θəmᴬ	Proto-Vietic *-ciːm 'bird'; Proto-Palaungic *ciːm 'bird'
fish	ʔa¹	ma³¹ ʔa⁵¹	*ʔaᴮ	Bolyu qɔ⁵³ 'fish'; Gtaʔ haʔɽo 'fish'; Sora ajoː 'fish'
fruit	plø¹	plø⁵¹	*pløᴮ	Proto-Austroasiatic *pleʔ 'fruit'
road	ʑa¹	gɣa⁵¹	*raᴮ	Proto-Austroasiatic *kraʔ 'road'

== Morphosyntax ==
Mảng is an analytic SVO language. However, unlike surrounding Kra-Dai and Hmong-Mien languages which are entirely absent of inflections, Mảng retains Austroasiatic derivational morphology and case-marking on nouns.

θɔ cǎp ta-ɲo
dog chase ACC-cat
"The dog chases the cat."

ʔu ʔo lam ʔæŋ-ciəj
1SG give rice DAT-chicken
"I give rice to the chicken."
