= Bolyu language =

Austroasiatic language spoken in China

Bolyu
- Pronunciation: [pə˧ lju˩˧]
- Native to: China
- Region: Longlin County, Guangxi
- Ethnicity: Bolyu 1,800 (2007)
- Native speakers: 1,400 (2012)
- Language family: Austroasiatic: Pakanic; Bolyu

Language codes
- ISO 639-3: ply
- Glottolog: boly1239
- ELP: Bolyu

The Bolyu language (autonym: [pə˧ lju˩˧]; Chinese: 巴琉语, 布流语; also known as Paliu, Palyu, or Lai 俫语, 徕语) is an Austroasiatic language of the Pakanic branch.

== Classification ==
Bolyu is related to the Bugan language, forming the Pakanic branch along with it. In 1984, Bolyu was first studied by Liang Min of the Nationalities Research Institute in Beijing. Liang was the first to suggest a Mon–Khmer affiliation of Bolyu, which was later confirmed by Western linguists such as Paul K. Benedict, Paul Sidwell, and Jerold A. Edmondson. However, the place of the Pakanic branch within the Mon–Khmer family is uncertain. Sidwell (1995) suggests that the Pakanic branch may be an Eastern Mon–Khmer branch, thus making it most closely related to the Vietic branch. However, Gérard Diffloth classifies Pakanic as Northern Mon–Khmer, making it most closely related to the Palaungic branch. Paul Sidwell later classified Bolyu and Bugan together as forming a separate Pakanic branch within Austroasiatic, while Mang is excluded as yet another separate branch of Austroasiatic.

== Distribution ==
Bolyu speakers are found in the following locations in southern China.

- Douhong 斗烘屯, Xinhe 新合村, Changfa township 长发, Longlin County, Guangxi (often living with Gelao neighbors). Also spoken in the nearby townships of Kechang 克长, De'e 德峨, and Changme 长么.
  - Xinhe 新合村 - Datiezhai 打铁寨, Changfajie 长发街: 50 speakers
  - Xinhua 新华村 - Luowan 罗湾: 300; Kabao 卡保, Renshang 仁上: 160 speakers
  - Villages with only Bolyu people: Muzi 亩子, Dazhai 大寨, Xiaozhai 小寨
- Guosha/Hengsha 过沙/亨沙, Wenya 文雅村, Puhe Miao Autonomous Township 普合苗族自治乡, Xilin County, Guangxi. Also spoken in Naya 那牙, Badahe Township 八大河乡. 230 speakers total.

Li (1999) documents the Bolyu variety of Muzitun 亩子屯, Xinhe Village 新合村, Changfa Township 长发乡, Longlin County, Guangxi.

In the following villages, only elderly speakers of Bolyu remain.

- Zhelang township 者浪乡: Zhezhai 者寨, Langrong 郎荣, Linghao 岭好
- Kechang township 克场乡: Haichang 海长
- Shechang township 蛇场乡: Daguo 达果

1,400 Bolyu reside in Guangxi, and over 1,000 in Yunnan. There are also some Bolyu in Guangnan County, Yunnan.

== Phonology ==
Bolyu is a monosyllabic tonal language like the surrounding Tai–Kadai, Hmong-Mien and even Vietic languages. Unlike Bugan, Bolyu does not have a tense–lax voice quality distinction.

=== Consonants ===
The following phonemes in Bolyu is inferred by Hsiu (2016) from field trips conducted by Li Xulian (1999)'s documentation of the Muzitun (亩子屯) dialect of Bolyu spoken in Xinhe Village (新合村), Changfa Township (长发乡), Longlin County, Guangxi and Hsiu (2012) in Changfa, Longlin. The Bolyu informants state that the language has some internal differences but mostly in tones, and these dialects are still mutually intelligible with each other.

==== Onsets ====
Bolyu onsets
| | | Labial | | | Alveolar | | | | (Alveolo-) Palatal | | | Velar | | | Uvular | Glottal | | |
| | | Labial | | | central | | sibilant | | (Alveolo-) Palatal | | | Velar | | | Uvular | Glottal | | |
| | | plain | pal. | vel. | plain | pal. | plain | pal. | plain | pal. | lab. | plain | pal. | lab. | Uvular | plain | pal. | lab. |
|---|---|---|---|---|---|---|---|---|---|---|---|---|---|---|---|---|---|---|
| Nasal | | m | mʲ | | n | | | | ɲ | | | ŋ | | | | | | |
| Plosive/ Affricate | voiceless | p | pʲ | | t | tʲ | t͡s | t͡sʲ | tɕ | tɕʲ | tɕʷ | k | kʲ | kʷ | q | ʔ | ʔʲ | ʔʷ |
| Plosive/ Affricate | aspirated | pʰ | pʰʲ | | tʰ | tʰʲ | t͡sʰ | | tɕʰ | tɕʰʲ | tɕʰʷ | kʰ | kʰʲ | | qʰ | | | |
| Plosive/ Affricate | prenasalized | ᵐb | ᵐbʲ | | ⁿd | ⁿdʲ | | | | | | | | | | | | |
| Fricative | voiceless | f | | | ɬ | ɬʲ | s | sʲ | ɕ | ɕʲ | ɕʷ | | | | | h | hʲ | hʷ |
| Fricative | voiced | v | vʲ | vˠ | | | | | ʑ | | | ɣ | ɣʲ | | | | | |
| Approximant | | | | | l | lʲ | | | j | | | w | | | | | | |

The Bolyu variety reported by Yan (2012) does not have /tɕʲ tɕʷ tɕʰʲ tɕʰʷ/ onset clusters, but instead it has /tsʰv sw kʰw hˠ/.

==== Codas ====
| | Bilabial | Alveolar | Palatal | Velar | Glottal |
|---|---|---|---|---|---|
| Plosive | p | t | | k | ʔ |
| Nasal | m | n | | ŋ | |
| Semivowel | u̯ | | i̯ | | |

=== Vowels ===
The Bolyu vowel system contains eight vowels, in which some of them are contrastive in length. However, Bugan's phonemic nasalization and tense-lax distinction are absent in Bolyu.

| | Front | Central | Back |
|---|---|---|---|
| Close | i iː | ɯ | u uː |
| Close-mid | e eː | ə | o |
| Open-mid | | | ɔ |
| Open | | a aː | |

| Short | | Long | |
| Vowel | Example | Vowel | Example |
|---|---|---|---|
| a | ɕaŋ⁵⁵ 'green' | aː | qaːt̚³¹ 'to run' |
| i | ʑi¹¹ 'tree root' | iː | ɬiːt̚⁵³ 'to die' |
| e | nde⁵³ 'water' | eː | laːp̚³¹ qeːŋ⁵³ 'chin' |
| u | mbuŋ⁵⁵ 'skin' | uː | mbuːŋ⁵⁵ 'liver' |
| ɔ | ʑɔŋ⁵⁵ 'foot' | | |
| ə | tɕəŋ⁵⁵ 'ginger' | | |
| ɯ | tɯ³³ 'to shoot' | | |
| o | to⁵⁵ 'near' | | |

=== Suprasegmentals (tones) ===
The 6-tone system in Bolyu is divided into nine categories. Two tones /31, 53/ occur in checked syllables (syllables ending with stop codas /-p̚, -t̚, -k̚/). Another six tones are found distributed in syllables ending with either sonorant codas or vowels.

| Tone | Contour | Tone letter | Context |
|---|---|---|---|
| low level | 11 | ˩ | open syllables |
| low rising | 13 | ˩˧ | open syllables |
| mid falling | 31 | ˧˩ | checked (-p̚, -t̚, -k̚) & open syllables |
| mid level | 33 | ˧ | open syllables |
| high falling | 53 | ˥˧ | checked & open syllables |
| high level | 55 | ˥ | open syllables |

== Morphosyntax ==
In Bolyu, there are certainly a number of prefixal elements that usually occur in some particular semantic class of words, although some of them do not seem to show the same semantic classification, at least not synchronically or transparently.

- An prefix mɔ- is often found in some broad categories of words, including body parts, fauna, and flora nomenclature with unclear meaning and function: mɔ⁵³ qɔ⁵⁵ 'dog skin tree'; mɔ⁵³ tɕi³¹ 'walnut tree'; mɔ⁵³ ɣuːn¹³ 'bamboo'; mɔ⁵³ tshau⁵⁵ tshən⁵³ 'camphorwood tree'; mɔ⁵³ ljaːŋ³¹ 'eagle'.
- An unknown prefix ɬai- that may be found in some flora terms. Eg. ɬai⁵³ tjit̚⁵³ 'persimmon'; ɬai⁵³ kwe⁵⁵ 'chestnut'; ɬai⁵³ kek̚⁵³ 'pear tree'; ɬai⁵³ kaːm⁵⁵ 'orange tree'; ɬai⁵³ tən⁵³ 'melon'.
- A prefix lɔŋ-: lɔŋ¹³ mi³¹ 'nose'; lɔŋ¹³ ʔi⁵³ 'butt hole'; lɔŋ¹³ mat̚⁵³ 'eye socket'.

The monosyllabic elements carrying lexical meanings also appear in lexicalized verb-noun compounds, i.e. noun incorporation, but some of them cannot manifest in free isolation. Eg. vɯŋ¹³qɔ⁵³ 'to catch fish'; tse³¹lei⁵⁵ 'to beat cow' (cf. kau¹¹lei⁵⁵ 'cow horn', lɔk⁵³lei⁵⁵ 'cowherd'). Similar lexicalized incorporation patterns are also found in Bugan, Munda, Nicobarese, Khasic, Vietic, Monic, Aslian as well, suggesting these systems being remnants of Proto-Austroasiatic morphosyntax.
