= Pakanic languages =

Austroasiatic language branch of China

Pakanic
- Geographic distribution: Southern China
- Linguistic classification: Austroasiatic: Pakanic
- Proto-language: Proto-Pakanic
- Subdivisions: Bolyu; Bugan

Language codes
- Glottolog: boly1240

The Pakanic languages constitute a branch of two Austroasiatic languages, Bolyu and Bugan. They are spoken in Guangxi and Yunnan provinces of southern China. Mang was formerly included, but is now considered by Paul Sidwell to form its own separate branch within Austroasiatic.

== Classification ==
Jenny & Sidwell (2015) consider Pakanic to be an independent branch of Austroasiatic.

Various classifications had previously been proposed for individual Pakanic languages. In 1990, Paul K. Benedict argued that Bolyu constitutes a separate Mon-Khmer branch. Edmondson & Gregerson (1996) listed many phonological and lexical similarities shared by Bolyu and Vietic languages. However, Gérard Diffloth later suggested that Pakanic (i.e., Bolyu and Bugan) shares an affinity with Palaungic languages and was part of a wider Northern Mon-Khmer group.

=== Mangic proposal ===
Mangic, a proposed language grouping that includes Mang as a sister to Pakanic within a unified subgroup of Austroasiatic, is recognized by Ilia Peiros (2004) and Sidwell's earlier classifications. Nguyen Van Loi also classified Mang within the Samtau group of Waic with Palaungic, although he later classified Mang as a sister of Waic (Sidwell 2009:133).

== Reconstruction ==
Proto-Pakanic, the proto-language ancestral to Bolyu and Bugan, was reconstructed by Andrew Hsiu (2016). Hsiu (2017), citing Li Xulian (1999), notes that Pakanic languages were formerly spoken further up north in Guizhou and were in close contact with Gelao. Hsiu (2017) also notes that Pakanic languages display loanword influence from Kra languages, and have also influenced Kra languages.

== See also ==
- Mang language, formerly considered to be closely related
