= Bugan language =

Austroasiatic language spoken in China

Bugan
- Pakan
- Native to: China
- Region: Yunnan
- Native speakers: 2,700 (2005)
- Language family: Austroasiatic: Pakanic; Bugan
- Dialects: Nala; Manlong

Language codes
- ISO 639-3: bbh
- Glottolog: buga1247
- ELP: Bugan

Bugan, Bogan, Pakan, or Bugeng (布甘语, 布干语, or 布赓语) is an Austroasiatic language. The existence of the Bugan language was not known by the rest of world until recently. There are about 3000 speakers, mostly in some villages in southern Guangnan (广南) and northern Xichou (西畴), Yunnan Province, China. Bugan is an analytic language, and word order and auxiliary words have important functions in the grammar.

== Distribution ==
=== Li Jinfang (1996) ===
According to Li Jinfang (1996), the Bugan-speaking population is distributed in seven villages across southern Guangnan (广南) and northern Xichou (西畴), Yunnan Province, China.

- Laowalong 老挖龙 (Bugan-only population); Bugan language: pə55 luŋ13
- Xinwalong 新挖龙 (Bugan-only population); Bugan language: pə55 tsuŋ13
- Jiuping 九平 (Bugan and Han Chinese population); Bugan language: pə55 tsiaŋ31
- Shibeipo 石北坡 (Bugan-only population); Bugan language: pə55 ɕe13
- Xinzhai 新寨 (Bugan and Han Chinese population); Bugan language: li̠31 laŋ13
- Malong 马龙 (Bugan-only population); Bugan language: pə55 ɣu31
- Nala 那拉 (Bugan and Han Chinese population)

=== Li Yunbing (2005) ===
According to a more recent survey by Li Yunbing (2005), the Bugan people, comprising a total of 500+ households and 2,700+ individuals, live in the following locations.

- Laowalong 老挖龙, Nasa Township 那洒镇; Bugan language: pə31 loŋ55
- Xinwalong 新挖龙; Bugan language: pə31 tɕoŋ55
- Xiaoping 小坪寨; Bugan language: pə31 tɕaŋ55
- Nala 那腊; Bugan language: pə31 pʰja44
- Jiuping 九坪, Zhuanjiao Township 篆角乡 (Chongtian Township 冲天乡); Bugan language: pə31 tɕa̠ŋ31
- Shibeipo 石碑坡; Bugan language: pə55 ɕe24
- Manlong 曼龙; Bugan language: pu31ɣu31

Li Yunbing also uses the term Bùgēng (布赓) in place of Bùgān (布甘).

== People ==
The Bugan people's autonym is pə55 ka̠n33, while the surrounding Han Chinese call them Huazu (Chinese: 花族; literally "flower people") or Hualo (Chinese: 花倮) due to their colorful clothing. Other autonyms are pu55 qe̠ŋ44 (in Manlong, Xichou County) and pə55 qe̠ŋ44 (in Nala and Xinwalong in Guangnan County). They are an unrecognized ethnic minority, and are currently classified as Yi. The Bugan are endogamous, and thus do not usually marry people from other ethnic groups

The Bugan people also hold their own New Year's Day celebration in April of the Chinese lunar calendar, which is separate from that of the Han Chinese New Year.

Common Bugan surnames include Li 李, Wang 王, Guo 郭, Luo 罗, Yan 严, Lu 卢, Pu 普, and Yi.

== Phonology ==
Bugan is a tonal SVO language. Unlike the Bolyu language, Bugan distinguishes between tense and lax voice qualities. In current linguistic publications on Bugan, tense voice is indicated by underlining vowels. Bugan has a total of 49 onsets (including various consonant clusters) and 67 possible rimes.

There is a small difference in the phonemic inventory between two Bugan dialects, Nala Bugan and Manlong Bugan:

- Nala Bugan is spoken in the Nala village (那腊), Nala town, Guangnan County, Wenshan Prefecture, Yunnan. The Bugan of this village call themselves pə⁵⁵qe̠ŋ⁴⁴ and their village pə³¹pʰja⁴⁴. Data of the Nala dialect was collected by Li Jinfang (2006). A brief grammatical sketch of Nala Bugan was provided by Li & Luo (2015).
- Manlong Bugan is spoken by the Bugan tribe of the Manlong (曼龙) village, Jijie Township, Xichou County, Wenshan Prefecture, Yunnan. It is mutually intelligible with Nala Bugan. Bugans refer to this village by their native toponym pu³¹ɣu³¹ and call themselves pu⁵⁵qe̠ŋ⁴⁴. Neighboring communities of the Manlong Bugans often call them the Flowery Luo (花倮) people, due to their colorful ethnic clothing. A grammatical description of Manlong Bugan has been documented in detail by Li Yunbing (2005).

=== Consonants ===
Phonemically, Manlong Bugan has two more consonants (by count) than Nala Bugan: unique to Manlong are the four consonants /d͡ʑ, ɴ, ɢ, qʰ/, while unique to Nala are the two /θ, v/, with their inventories otherwise aligning; prenasalized and palatalized clusters are not included in their phonemic inventory counts.

However, Manlong Bugan possesses a richer inventory of complex cluster onsets compared to Nala Bugan, featuring a series of glided (palatalized) clusters, a series of prenasalized clusters, and three other labial clusters /pt͡s, pt͡sʰ, bd/.

==== Nala consonants ====
Initial consonants in Nala Bugan
			Labial	Dental/ Alveolar		(Alveolo-) Palatal	Velar	Uvular	Glottal
			Labial	plain	sibilant	(Alveolo-) Palatal	Velar	Uvular	Glottal
Nasal			m	n		ɲ	ŋ		
Stop/ Affricate	voiceless	plain	p	t	t͡s	(t͡ɕ)	k	q	ʔ
Stop/ Affricate	voiceless	aspirated	pʰ	tʰ	t͡sʰ	(t͡ɕʰ)	kʰ		
Stop/ Affricate	voiceless	prenasalized			ᵐt͡sʰ			ᵑq	
Stop/ Affricate	voiced	plain	b	d	d͡z		ɡ		
Stop/ Affricate	voiced	prenasalized	ᵐb	ᵐd, ⁿd	ᵐd͡z, ⁿd͡z		ᵑɡ		
Fricative	voiceless		f	θ	s	ɕ	x		h
Fricative	voiced		v			ʑ	ɣ		
Approximant			w	l		j			

- Prenasal consonant cluster sounds include /ᵐt͡s/, /ᵐt͡sʰ/, /pt͡s/, /pt͡sʰ/, /ᵐd͡z/, /ᵐv/, /ᵐd/, /ᵑg/, /ᵑq/, /ⁿd/, and /ⁿd͡z/.
- Sounds /t͡s, t͡sʰ/ are heard as alveolo-palatal [t͡ɕ, t͡ɕʰ] when preceding /i/.
- In tone /31/, /ᵐt͡s, ᵐt͡sʰ, ᵐd͡z/ may be pronounced as [pt͡s], [pt͡sʰ], [pd͡z]. Eg. /mtsʰɑ³¹/ ~ [ptsʰɑ³¹] "to rub with the hands, make a cord."
- Cluster /ŋg/ sometimes may be realized as plain velar nasal. Eg. /ŋga³¹/ ~ [ŋa³¹] "yellow."

==== Manlong consonants ====
Initial consonants in Manlong Bugan
			Labial		Alveolar			(Alveolo-) Palatal	Velar		Uvular	Glottal
			plain	pal.	plain	pal.	sibilant	(Alveolo-) Palatal	plain	pal.	Uvular	Glottal
Nasal			m	mʲ	n			ɲ	ŋ		ɴ	
Stop/ Affricate	voiceless	plain	p	pʲ	t	tʲ	t͡s	t͡ɕ	k	kʲ	q	ʔ
Stop/ Affricate	voiceless	aspirated	pʰ	pʰʲ	tʰ	tʰʲ	t͡sʰ	t͡ɕʰ	kʰ		qʰ	
Stop/ Affricate	voiced	plain	b	bʲ	d	dʲ	d͡z	d͡ʑ	ɡ		ɢ	
Stop/ Affricate	voiced	prenasalized	ᵐb	ᵐbʲ	ᵐd, ⁿd		ᵐbd͡z, ⁿd͡z	ᶮd͡ʑ	ᵑɡ		ᶰɢ	
Fricative	voiceless		f				s	ɕ	x	xʲ		h
Fricative	voiced							ʑ	ɣ			
Approximant			w		l			j				

=== Vowels ===
==== Nala vowels ====
In Nala Bugan, there is a distinction between tense-throat vowels (indicated here with an underline) and lax-throat (plain) vowels.

Oral vowels
	Front			Central		Back			
	plain		tense	plain	tense	plain		tense	
Close	i	y	i			ɯ	u	ɯ	u
Close-mid	e		e	ə		o			
Open-mid	ɛ		ɛ	ə		ɔ			
Open				a	a				

Nasal vowels
	Front	Central		Back	
	Front	plain	tense	plain	tense
Close				ũ	ũ
Mid	ɛ̃	ə̃		õ	
Open		ã	ã		

In the same syllable, tense and lax vowels do not co-occur. The restriction seems to be phonemic, because tense vowels are described as having a lower and more retracted tongue position than their lax counterparts. Eg. ta³¹ "near" is realized as a central-open [a], while tense /a̠/ in ta̠³¹ "to bet" is closer to [ɑ].

==== Manlong vowels ====
Like Nala Bugan, lax and tense vowel contrast is found in Manlong Bugan. Each monophthong also has a nasalized counterpart.

	Front	Central	Back
Close	i		u
Close-mid	e	ə	o
Open-mid	ɛ	ə	ɔ
Open		a	

=== Tones ===
==== Nala tones ====
In syllables with a rising tone, tense vowels are accompanied by a noticeably constricted or tight laryngeal setting, making the tense quality acoustically salient. In syllables with the falling tone (31), however, the laryngeal tension weakens, so the contrast relies more heavily on vowel quality itself. There are six contrastive tones in Nala Bugan. The neutral tone only occurs in some prefixes.

Tone	Contour	Context
neutral	0	open syllables
low rising	13	open syllables
high rising	35	open syllables
low falling	31	checked (-p̚, -t̚, -k̚) & open syllables
mid level	33	checked & open syllables
high level	55	checked & open syllables

Tone is highly unstable in Bugan. A portion of the lexicon can be pronounced with two tones without semantic losses. E.g. ʑou³³/⁵⁵ 'earth', χau⁵⁵/³¹ 'valley', mtshi⁵⁵/¹³ 'to milk'. Tone shift occurs relative common in speech contexts with harmonic assimilation to the tone contour of the conjunctive element. E.g. χɛ³¹ 'bad', mə⁵⁵ χɛ⁵⁵ 'taste bad'; nam³⁵ 'year', mə⁵⁵ nam⁵⁵ 'one year', nam³³ ni³³ 'this year'.

==== Manlong tones ====
Manlong Bugan reportedly has four contour tones: /55/, /44/, /24/, and /31/.

== Morphosyntax ==
=== Nominal morphology ===
==== Proforms ====
In possessive constructions, tone contour in pronouns is raised to /55/ to express possessive relation with the syntactically NP head. Eg. pa²⁴ ʔɔ⁵⁵ (father 1SG.POSS) "my father".

		singular	dual	plural
1st person	exclusive	ʔɔ³¹	wi³¹ bi̠ɔ̱³¹	pɛ³¹
1st person	inclusive	ʔɔ³¹	wi³¹ bi̠ɔ̱³¹	wi³¹
2nd person		mɯ³¹	mi³¹ bi̠ɔ̱³¹	mi³¹
3rd person		ʔi³¹	hɛ³¹ bi̠ɔ̱³¹	hɛ³¹

==== Interrogatives ====
Bugan appears to build interrogatives analytically by attaching the element -pau³⁵ to nominal or pronominal bases. For example, mɯ⁵⁵ pau³⁵ means "who?" but can also function as an infinitive pronoun "anyone". This also holds true with mə dze⁵⁵ "what, whatever".

Interrogative	Meaning
mə dze⁵⁵	'what?'
ʔo⁵⁵pau³⁵	'where?'
ɣen⁵⁵pau³⁵	'why?'
ɣɯ³¹pau³⁵	'how?'
mɯ⁵⁵ pau³⁵	'which one?'
ta⁵⁵ pau³⁵	'which ones?'
tə⁵⁵pau³⁵	'how many?'
tsə⁵⁵pau³⁵	'when, which day?'

==== Classifiers ====
There are two types of classifiers in Bugan.

Noun		Verbal	
Classifier	Purpose	Classifier	Purpose
pau³¹	humans	tsi³⁵	time frequency
biə³³	animals	fɛ³¹	for trip
li̠³³	long objects	mtsa³⁵	for eating
tsʰe¹³	objects, rivers	tuŋ⁵⁵	for biting
tsu̠ŋ⁵⁵	plants	ŋga³¹	for sleeps, naps
liu³³	thin, sheet objects	ta̱ŋ³³	for hitting with fist
tsam³³	pairs		
pam³⁵	portions		

==== Numerals ====
Bugan has a typical Austroasiatic decimal counting system with head-first combining forms for higher numerals. For examples, nineteen in Bugan is mã³¹ ɕi³³ (10 + 9), forty is pau³³ mã³¹ (4 x 10), 200 is bi³¹ ʑu³¹ (2 x 100), and 10,010 is mə⁵⁵ vã¹³ lɛ³³ ma³¹ or 1 x 10,000 + 10. Comparison of some cardinal numerals of Bugan, Mang (Mangic), and Gorum (South Munda):

Bugan, Mang, Gorum counting
gloss	Bugan	Mang	Gorum	Notes
one	bɔ⁵⁵/mə⁵⁵	măk⁶	bɔˀj	mə⁵⁵ is the weakly suppletive form of bɔ⁵⁵ in NPs with classifiers and numbers higher than 100
two	biɔ³¹/bi³¹	ʑɯəi²	bag, bagu	bi³¹ is the shorter form of biɔ³¹, only occurs in NPs with classifiers and numbers larger than 100
three	mtse³¹	pe³	yag, yagu, yagi	cf. Santali pɛ
four	pau³³	pun²	ungi	cf. Santali pon
five	mi³³	hăn²	mɔnlɔy	
six	pi̱o̱³³	ʑɔ̆m²	turgi	cf. Palaung tɔr, Semelai pruʔ
seven	po̱u̱³¹	tăm¹ py³	gulgi	
eight	sã³³	tăm¹ ham²	tamgi	
nine	ɕi³³	tăm¹ θin²	timgi	
ten	mã³¹	ʑi³ mɛ⁴	galgi	cf. Wa kau, Palaung ʔukɤr
hundred	ʑu³¹	ran⁵~ʑan⁵		

=== Derivation ===
A significant portion of Bugan lexemes appears to be derived via phonological alternation, a widespread feature in Mainland Southeast Asian linguistic area:

- kui̠³³ 'to dry with smoke' and kui³³ 'fire smoke'
- ɕi⁵⁵po³¹⁽⁵⁵⁾ 'yesterday evening' and ɕa⁵⁵po³¹⁽⁵⁵⁾ 'tomorrow evening'
- ŋɔ³³ 'peppery' and ŋa³³ 'salted'
- tshuŋ³¹ 'throat' and tshuŋ³³ 'thirsty'
- mtsha¹³ 'to kill' and mtsa³¹ 'to die'

A diminutive infix xi³¹ is often found in terms relating to small female animal, e.g. mu³³li⁵⁵ "cow", mu³³xi³¹li⁵⁵ "small cow"; mu³³ɕen⁵⁵ "nanny (goat)", mu³³xi³ɕen⁵⁵ "small nanny (goat)".

Bugan nouns display a morphological distinction between free forms and combining forms. In free forms, the monosyllabic nominal root usually appear with a prefix, although their characterization as prefixes is somewhat arbitrary, as they never manifest in free isolation or carry any lexical meaning and productive function. Those dozen or so prefixes in Bugan seem to be fossilized retentions of an earlier classification system, even if many common ones occur across various noun categories that are difficult to unite semantically.

- pə⁵⁵ – commonly found in body parʦ, kinship, nations, people, made objects, or locative nouns: pə⁵⁵lai³³ "tongue"; pə⁵⁵bop³¹/bou³¹ "head"; pə⁵⁵khui⁵⁵ "the Han"; pə⁵⁵mio³¹ "the Miao/Hmong"; pə⁵⁵ʑuŋ⁵⁵⁽³¹⁾ "old people"; pə⁵⁵poŋ⁵⁵ "hammer"; pə⁵⁵ɕi̠⁵⁵ 'left side'.
- tə⁵⁵/⁰ – body parts, localities, or animals: tə⁵⁵qo̱u̱³⁵ "palm (of the hand)"; tə⁵⁵ɣo⁵⁵ "inside"; tə⁵⁵qɔ³³thɔ⁵⁵ "tiger".
- te⁵⁵ – plants, birds, rivers, fauna, made objects, or weather: te⁵⁵taŋ⁵⁵ "moss"; te⁵⁵ta̱n³³ "pumpkin"; te⁵⁵kɔ̱ŋ³⁵ "shrimp".
- pu⁵⁵- – animals: pu⁵⁵laŋ³¹ "stallion"; pu⁵⁵ɕen⁵⁵ "nanny (goat)".
- mu³³ – plants and female animals: mu³³paŋ³¹ "peach tree"; mu³³san⁵⁵ "pine tree"; mu³³tsau³³ "bitch"; mu³³laŋ³¹ "mare".
- tse⁰ – birds and made objects: tse⁰qa³⁵ "duck"; tse⁰ŋaŋ³⁵ "goose"; tse⁰va̠n³¹ '(ringnecked) pheasant'.
- mə³³ – ready-made tools or objects: mə³³tsa³¹ "hand straw cutter", mə³³dou³³ "firewood knife", mə³³kua³¹ "folk song".
- lə⁰ – few body parts: lə⁰kə³³ 'lower jaw', lə⁰po⁵⁵ 'shoulder'.
- di³³ – January–March, or December of the Chinese lunar calendar: di³³tsaŋ³ "January", di³³ȵi³¹ "February", di³³sã¹³ "March", di³³liã³¹ "December".
- mə⁵⁵ – April–November of the Chinese lunar calendar: mə⁵⁵pau³³ "April", mə⁵⁵mi³³ "May", mə⁵⁵bɔ⁵⁵ "November".

Additionally, new lexical words can be formed via compounding. There are lexicalized verb-noun compounds, i.e. noun incorporation. E.g. tsɔ̱³¹ɕɔ̱³⁵ ("go hunting"), derived from tsɔ̱³¹ "hunt" and ɕɔ̱³⁵ "game". Compounds are generally head-first, e.g. biou³³ɣɔ³³ (hill-rock) "rock hill, karst formation"; ʑuŋ⁵⁵⁽³¹⁾tse³¹ (foot-mountain) "foot of mountain", although there are few examples in which the modifier precedes the head, such as da³⁵ta̱ɯ̱³⁵ (water-field) "rice field".

=== Copulas ===
Nala Bugan has two copulas: generic ni³³/ȵu³³ and negative mə⁵⁵sa̱ŋ⁵⁵. ȵu³³, presumably derived from the same root which means "do", is not frequently used as copula.

ʔɔ³¹ ni³³/ȵu³³ pə⁵⁵ka̱n³³
I COP Bugan
'I am a Bugan.'

The preverbal negative mə⁵⁵ appears to be deeply connected with a wide array of Munda and Austroasiatic preverbal negatives otherwise, such as the conservative South Munda Juang finite negative ma-, Gtaʔ ma=, Kharia um, Gorum ambu.

Bugan (Li & Luo (2015:1044))

ʔɔ³¹ mə⁵⁵ sa̱ŋ⁵⁵ piau¹³ pə⁵⁵se³³
I NEG COP person Guangnan
'I am not a native of Guangnan.'

Kharia (Peterson (2011), Kerkeʈʈā, (1990:11))

am um co=na=m laʔ=ta
You NEG go=MID.IRR=2SG EMOT=MID.PRES
'It looks like you won't be going.'

Hill Gtaʔ (Anderson (2020), field notes)

ma-bihæ=nǝ ngire
NEG.ATTR-marry=ATTR young.man
'Unmarried young man, bachelor'

== Sample text ==
The following story was narrated by a Bugan man named Wang Zhiyou in Manlong dialect, Manlong village, Xichou County, Wenshan Prefecture, Yunnan, recorded and translated by Li Yunbing (2005).

Bugan folklore: The Sun and the Chicken

pei²⁴ tɕaŋ³¹ tɕa̠²⁴
sun and chicken
'The sun and the chicken.'

tɕaɯ³¹kei⁴⁴, pei²⁴ kai⁴⁴ ɕi̠⁴⁴ mou⁴⁴na⁴⁴,
before sun exist nine sisters
'Long ago, there were nine suns in the sky.'

xa³¹ ɣɔ̠⁴⁴ tɕi̠⁴⁴ ɣɔ̠⁴⁴ ka̠³¹, xa³¹ lɯ̠³¹ tɕi̠⁴⁴ lɯ̠³¹ tɕo̠u³¹
sundry stone then stone crack sundry grass then grass dry
'The heat cracked the rocks and burnt all the grasses and plants.'

xo⁵⁵mɯ⁴⁴ɣi̠³¹ lɛ²⁴ mɯ⁵⁵ ɣoŋ²⁴ tu̠³¹ ma²⁴,
fairy ADD NEG bear able DISC
'Even the fairy couldn't stand it.'

ɕi̠⁴⁴ ʑa̠u³¹ ptsou⁴⁴ qoŋ⁴⁴ ʑa̠u³¹,
then go to pond go
'and had to get into the pond.'

qa³¹la³¹ tɕʰaŋ⁴⁴ pjou³¹ po³¹ tɕa̠²⁴
then invite heavenly.dog come bite
'(She had to) ask the heavenly dogs to eat (the suns).'

pei²⁴ ɕi⁵⁵ kou⁴⁴ loŋ⁴⁴ ʑa̠u⁵⁵ ma²⁴, ɕi̠⁴⁴
sun then hide hole go DISC then
'But the latter went hiding in their burrows.'

la⁴⁴ ȵo̠u⁴⁴ ku³¹ ŋa̠²⁴ ma²⁴
again do sky dark DISC
'making the sky dark.'

pʰi³¹ mɯ⁵⁵ȵdʑi⁴⁴ qa²⁴ lɛ⁵⁵ mɯ⁵⁵ no̠³¹ ma²⁴
call what call ADD NEG come DISC
'The suns refused to come out despite numerous requests (from all kinds of animals).'

tɕʰaŋ⁴⁴ tɕau⁴⁴ qa²⁴ ma²⁴, qa²⁴ lɛ⁵⁵
invite bamboo.chicken call DISC call ADD
'The bamboo chicken was (the first to be) asked to call (the suns out).'

mɯ⁵⁵ no̠³¹ ma²⁴
NEG come DISC
'but (they still) hid (themselves in their burrows)'

pu⁵⁵dou²⁴ ma²⁴, tɕa̠²⁴ la⁴⁴ qa²⁴ sai⁴⁴, i³¹ tu⁴⁴ no̠³¹ ma²⁴
later.on ADD chicken then call again it exit come DISC
'Later on, after many attempts, the chicken made suns come out.'

tɕau⁴⁴ lɛ̠³¹ ma²⁴
bamboo.chicken shy DISC
'The bamboo chicken felt embarrassed.'

tɕau⁴⁴ qʰe̠i³¹ ma²⁴, ʑo̠ŋ⁵⁵ ko³¹ la̠⁴⁴ ma²⁴
bamboo.chicken run DISC foot a.bit red DISC
'and (the chicken) ran away, its feet turning red from running.'

ɣo²⁴ qo⁵⁵ mɯ⁵⁵ ɕaŋ⁵⁵ ma²⁴, i³¹ qo³¹ mbjau⁴⁴ ʑa̠u⁵⁵
since then NEG raise DISC it then hill go
'From then on, the bamboo chicken turned into wild birds, living in the bush.'
