= Gérard Diffloth =

French linguist (1939–2023)

- Born: 13 February 1939; Châteauroux, France
- Died: 14 August 2023 (aged 84); Surin, Thailand
- Occupation: Linguist
- Partner: Wongjaroen "Som" Somruan

Academic background
- Education: University of California, Los Angeles

Academic work
- Institutions: EFEO
- Main interests: Austroasiatic languages

Gérard Diffloth (13 February 1939 – 14 August 2023) was a French linguist known as a leading specialist in the Austroasiatic languages. As a linguistics professor, he was employed at the University of Chicago and Cornell University. He received his Ph.D. from UCLA, after a dissertation on the Irula language. He was an advocate of immersion fieldwork for linguistic research.

Diffloth was known for his widely cited 1974 and 2005 classifications of the Austroasiatic languages.

Diffloth was a consulting editor of the journal Mon-Khmer Studies.

Gérard Diffloth died on 14 August 2023, at the age of 84, in Surin, Thailand.

== Selected bibliography ==
- Diffloth, Gérard. A History of the Khmer Language. [in preparation].
- Diffloth, Gérard. The Dvaravati Old Mon Language and Nyah Kur. Monic language studies, vol. 1. Bangkok, Thailand: Chulalongkorn University Print. House, 1984. ISBN 974-563-783-1
- Diffloth, Gérard. The Wa languages. Berkeley: Dept. of Linguistics, University of California, 1980.
- Diffloth, Gérard. An Appraisal of Benedict's Views on Austroasiatic and Austro-Thai Relations. Kyoto: Center for Southeast Asian Studies, Kyoto University, 1976.
- Diffloth, Gérard, and Zide, Norman H. Austroasiatic Number Systems. 1976.
- Diffloth, Gérard. Proto-Mon–Khmer Final Spirants. Kyoto: Center for Southeast Asian Studies, Kyoto University, 1976.
- Diffloth, Gérard. The Irula Language, a Close Relative of Tamil. Doctoral thesis, University of California, Los Angeles, 1968.
