= Austroasiatic languages =

Language family concentrated in Southeast Asia

Austroasiatic
- Austro-Asiatic
- Geographic distribution: Southeast, South and East Asia
- Native speakers: est. 117 million
- Linguistic classification: One of the world's primary language families
- Proto-language: Proto-Austroasiatic
- Subdivisions: Munda; Khasi-Palaungic; Khmuic; Mang; Pakanic; Vietic; Katuic; Bahnaric; Khmer; Pearic; Monic; Aslian; Nicobarese

Language codes
- ISO 639-5: aav
- Glottolog: aust1305 Austroasiatic
- Austroasiatic languages by branch Munda Khasic Palaungic Khmuic Vietic Katuic Bahnaric Khmer Monic Aslian Pearic Pakanic Nicobarese

- Austroasiatic languages

The Austroasiatic languages (Note: Sometimes also Austro-Asiatic or Austroasian) (/ˌɒstroʊ.eɪʒiˈætɪk, ˌɔː-/ OSS-troh-ay-zhee-AT-ik, AWSS-) are a large language family spoken throughout Mainland Southeast Asia, South Asia, and East Asia. These languages are natively spoken by the majority of the population in Vietnam and Cambodia, and by minority populations scattered throughout parts of Thailand, Laos, India, Myanmar, Malaysia, Bangladesh, Nepal, and southern China. Approximately 117 million people speak an Austroasiatic language, of which more than two-thirds are Vietnamese speakers. Among the Austroasiatic languages, only Vietnamese, Khmer, and Mon have lengthy, established presences in the written, historical record. Only two are presently considered to be the national languages of sovereign states: Vietnamese in Vietnam, and Khmer in Cambodia. The Mon language is a recognized indigenous language in Myanmar and Thailand, while the Wa language is a "recognized national language" in the de facto autonomous Wa State within Myanmar. Santali is one of the 22 scheduled languages of India. The remainder of the family's languages are spoken by minority groups and have no official status.

Ethnologue identifies 168 Austroasiatic languages. These form thirteen established families (plus perhaps Shompen, which is poorly attested, as a fourteenth) that have traditionally been grouped into two, as Mon–Khmer, and Munda. However, one recent classification posits three groups (Munda, Mon–Khmer, and Khasi–Khmuic), while another has abandoned Mon–Khmer as a taxon altogether, making it synonymous with the larger family.

Scholars generally date the ancestral language to c. 3000 BC – c. 2000 BC with a homeland in Mainland Southeast Asia or southern China. Sidwell (2022) proposes that the locus of Proto-Austroasiatic was in the Red River Delta area around c. 2500 BC – c. 2000 BC.

== Etymology ==
The name Austroasiatic was coined in 1906 by Wilhelm Schmidt (German: austroasiatisch) based on auster, the Latin word for "South" (but idiosyncratically used by Schmidt to refer to the southeast), and "Asia". Despite the literal meaning of its name, only three Austroasiatic branches are actually spoken in South Asia: Khasic, Munda, and Nicobarese.

Prior to Schmidt (1906), scholars referred to this language family by various terms, such as Mon-Annam by Logan (1856), Cust (1878) and Blagden (1894); Kol-Annam by Logan (1859), as Austroasiatic linguistics was still in its early stage.

== History ==
The first development of Austroasiatic linguistics started in mid-19th century. In 1848, Brian Houghton Hodgson noticed that the so-called "Kol languages" (Ho, Santali) of Bengal constitute a third major linguistic family of India alongside Indo-Aryan and Dravidian, marking the first explicit genetic classification of what later an unrelated language family. Few years later, British James Richardson Logan (1850) and American Francis Mason (1854) independently recognized lexical similarities between Ho and Mon and Vietnamese. Two years later, in 1856, Logan proposed a "Mon-Anam" language family, comprising at least Munda, Mon, Khmer, Vietnamese, Khasi, Nicobarese, Pearic and Aslian, judging from his sample Comparative Vocabulary. In a publication released three years later, Logan consolidated his hypothesis as "Kol-Anam" family:

Both groups, in their glossarial basis, are branches of one formation, much more akin to Tibeto-Burman than to Dravidian. Dravidian as the Kol dialects are in phonology and in much of their grammar and vocabularies, they are radically South Himalaic of the older or Mon-Anam type. Near—alike in geographical position and in form—as the Mon-Anam languages are to the Chinese, they are but disintegrated Kol of the ancient form.

Logan and Mason's early works were progressively followed up by prominent researchers such as Robert Needham Cust, who added Palaungic in 1878; Ernst Kuhn, who added Bahnaric and Khmuic in 1889; Charles Otto Blagden, who suggested a diffusionist theory instead of a genetic connection. George Abraham Grierson, despite having doubts about the Austroasiatic connection in his Linguistic Survey of India, wrote:

The most probable solution of the whole problem seems to be that the Muṇḍā and the Mōn-Khmēr languages are derived from one and the same base. Each group has, however, had an independent history of its own, under the influence of various foreign elements. It seems probable that the Muṇḍā languages have developed the tendencies of the common parent tongue with greatest fidelity.

— Grierson (1906, p. 14)

In 1942, based on typological perspectives, Thomas Sebeok proposed that the Austroasiatic phylum is divided into three branches: Mon-Khmer, Munda, Annam-Muong (Vietic). He then asserted that the structural differences between Mon-Khmer and Munda are so great that even Schmidt's lexical parallels may not be considered valid evidence to argue a common origin.

It follows from the foregoing that, while genetic connection between Mon-Khmer and Munda cannot be categorically denied, in the absence of proof or even good evidence the latter must be excluded from the Austroasiatic subgroup of the Austric family of languages.

— Sebeok (1942, p. 211)

The classification issues regarding Munda and Vietnamese were eventually tackled by André-Georges Haudricourt (1953, 1954) and Heinz-Jürgen Pinnow (1959) just a decade later.

== Typology ==
Regarding word structure, Austroasiatic languages are well known for having an iambic "sesquisyllabic" pattern, with basic nouns and verbs consisting of an initial, unstressed, reduced minor syllable followed by a stressed, full syllable. This reduction of presyllables has led to a variety of phonological shapes of the same original Proto-Austroasiatic prefixes, such as the causative prefix, ranging from CVC syllables to consonant clusters to single consonants among the modern languages. As for word formation, most Austroasiatic languages have a variety of derivational prefixes, and many have infixes, but suffixes are almost completely non-existent in most branches except Munda, and a few specialized exceptions in other Austroasiatic branches.

The Austroasiatic languages are further characterized as having unusually large vowel inventories and employing some sort of pitch register contrast, either between modal (normal) voice and breathy (lax) voice or between modal voice and creaky voice. Languages in the Pearic branch and some in the Vietic branch can have a three- or even four-way voicing contrast.

However, some Austroasiatic languages have lost the register contrast by evolving more diphthongs or in a few cases, such as Vietnamese, tonogenesis. Vietnamese has been so heavily influenced by Chinese that its original Austroasiatic phonological quality is obscured and now resembles that of South Chinese languages, whereas Khmer, which had more influence from Sanskrit, has retained a more typically Austroasiatic structure.

== Proto-language ==
Much work has been done on the reconstruction of Proto-Mon–Khmer in Harry L. Shorto's Mon–Khmer Comparative Dictionary. Little work has been done on the Munda languages, which are poorly documented. Proto-Mon–Khmer becomes synonymous with the Proto-Austroasiatic language with their demotion from a primary branch. Paul Sidwell (2005) reconstructs the consonant inventory of Proto-Mon–Khmer as follows:

| | | Labial | Alveolar | Palatal | Velar | Glottal |
|---|---|---|---|---|---|---|
| Plosive | voiceless | *p | *t | *c | *k | *ʔ |
| Plosive | voiced | *b | *d | *ɟ | *ɡ | |
| Plosive | implosive | *ɓ | *ɗ | *ʄ | | |
| Nasal | | *m | *n | *ɲ | *ŋ | |
| Liquid | | *w | *l, *r | *j | | |
| Fricative | | | *s | | | *h |

This is identical to earlier reconstructions except for *ʄ. *ʄ is better preserved in the Katuic languages, which Sidwell has specialized in.

== Internal classification ==
Linguists traditionally recognize two primary divisions of Austroasiatic: the Mon–Khmer languages of Southeast Asia, Northeast India, and the Nicobar Islands, and the Munda languages of East and Central India and parts of Bangladesh and Nepal. However, no evidence for this classification has ever been published.

According to standard linguistic consensus, the principal branches of the Austroasiatic family are universally acknowledged as valid clades, although their internal relationships continue to be a subject of ongoing scholarly debate. By contrast, the relationships between these families within Austroasiatic are debated. In addition to the traditional classification, two recent proposals are given, neither of which accepts traditional "Mon–Khmer" as a valid unit. However, little of the data used for competing classifications has ever been published and, therefore, cannot be evaluated by peer review.

In addition, there are suggestions that additional branches of Austroasiatic might be preserved in substrata of Acehnese in Sumatra (Diffloth), the Chamic languages of Vietnam, and the Land Dayak languages of Borneo (Adelaar 1995).

=== Diffloth (1974) ===
Diffloth's widely cited original classification, now abandoned by Diffloth himself, is used in Encyclopædia Britannica and—except for the breakup of Southern Mon–Khmer—in Ethnologue.

- Austro‑Asiatic
  - Munda
    - North Munda
      - Korku
      - Kherwarian
    - South Munda
      - Kharia–Juang
      - Koraput Munda
  - Mon–Khmer
    - Eastern Mon–Khmer
      - Khmer (Cambodian)
      - Pearic
      - Bahnaric
      - Katuic
      - Vietic (Vietnamese, Muong)
    - Northern Mon–Khmer
      - Khasi (Meghalaya, India)
      - Palaungic
      - Khmuic
    - Southern Mon–Khmer
      - Mon
      - Aslian (Malaya)
      - Nicobarese (Nicobar Islands)

=== Peiros (2004) ===
Peiros is a lexicostatistic classification, based on percentages of shared vocabulary. This means that languages can appear to be more distantly related than they actually are due to language contact. Indeed, when Sidwell (2009) replicated Peiros's study with languages known well enough to account for loans, he did not find the internal (branching) structure below.

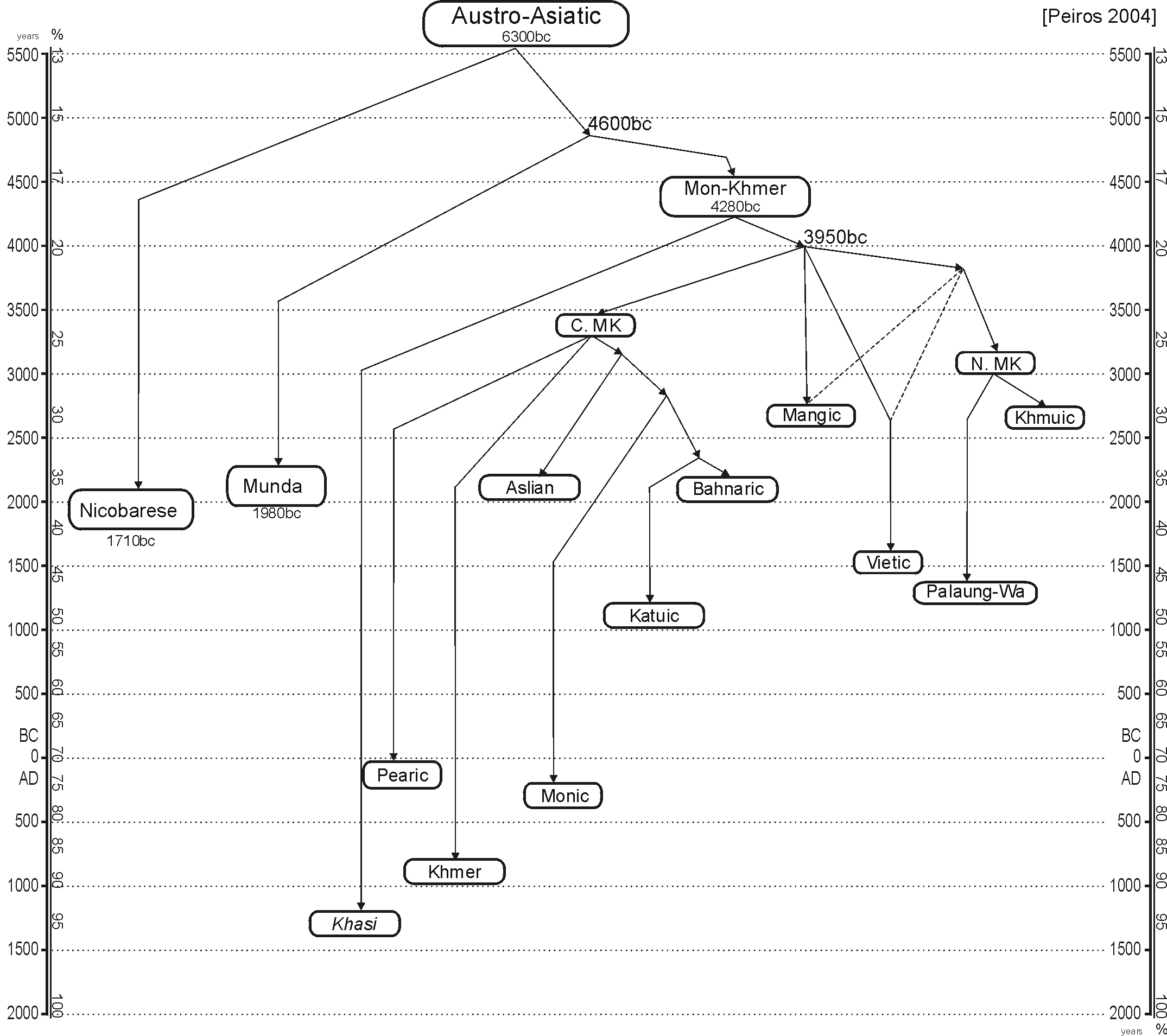

- Austro‑Asiatic
  - Nicobarese
  - Munda–Khmer
    - Munda
    - Mon–Khmer
      - Khasi
      - Nuclear Mon–Khmer
        - Mangic (Mang + Palyu) (perhaps in Northern MK)
        - Vietic (perhaps in Northern MK)
        - Northern Mon–Khmer
          - Palaungic
          - Khmuic
        - Central Mon–Khmer
          - Khmer dialects
          - Pearic
          - Asli-Bahnaric
            - Aslian
            - Mon–Bahnaric
              - Monic
              - Katu–Bahnaric
                - Katuic
                - Bahnaric

=== Diffloth (2005) ===
Diffloth compares reconstructions of various clades, and attempts to classify them based on shared innovations, though like other classifications the evidence has not been published. As a schematic, we have:

- Austro‑Asiatic
  - Munda
    - - Remo
      - Savara
    - - Kharia–Juang
      - - Korku
        - Kherwarian
  - Khasi–Khmuic
    - - Khmuic
      - - Pakanic
        - Palaungic
    - Khasian
  - (Nuclear) Mon–Khmer
    - - - Vietic
        - ?
          Katuic
      - - Bahnaric
        - - Khmer
          - Pearic
    - - Nicobarese
      - - Aslian
        - Monic

Or in more detail,

- Austro‑Asiatic
  - Munda languages (India)
    - Koraput: 7 languages
    - Core Munda languages
      - Kharian–Juang: 2 languages
      - North Munda languages
        - Korku
        - Kherwarian: 12 languages
  - Khasi–Khmuic languages (Northern Mon–Khmer)
    - Khasian: 3 languages of north eastern India and adjacent region of Bangladesh
    - Palaungo-Khmuic languages
      - Khmuic: 13 languages of Laos and Thailand
      - Palaungo-Pakanic languages
        - Pakanic or Palyu: 4 or 5 languages of southern China and Vietnam
        - Palaungic: 21 languages of Burma, southern China, and Thailand
  - Nuclear Mon–Khmer languages
    - Khmero-Vietic languages (Eastern Mon–Khmer)
      - Vieto-Katuic languages ?
        - Vietic: 10 languages of Vietnam and Laos, including Muong and Vietnamese, which has the most speakers of any Austroasiatic language.
        - Katuic: 19 languages of Laos, Vietnam, and Thailand.
      - Khmero-Bahnaric languages
        - Bahnaric: 40 languages of Vietnam, Laos, and Cambodia.
        - Khmeric languages
          - The Khmer dialects of Cambodia, Thailand, and Vietnam.
          - Pearic: 6 languages of Cambodia.
    - Nico-Monic languages (Southern Mon–Khmer)
      - Nicobarese: 6 languages of the Nicobar Islands, a territory of India.
      - Asli-Monic languages
        - Aslian: 19 languages of peninsular Malaysia and Thailand.
        - Monic: 2 languages, the Mon language of Burma and the Nyahkur language of Thailand.

=== Sidwell (2009–2015) ===
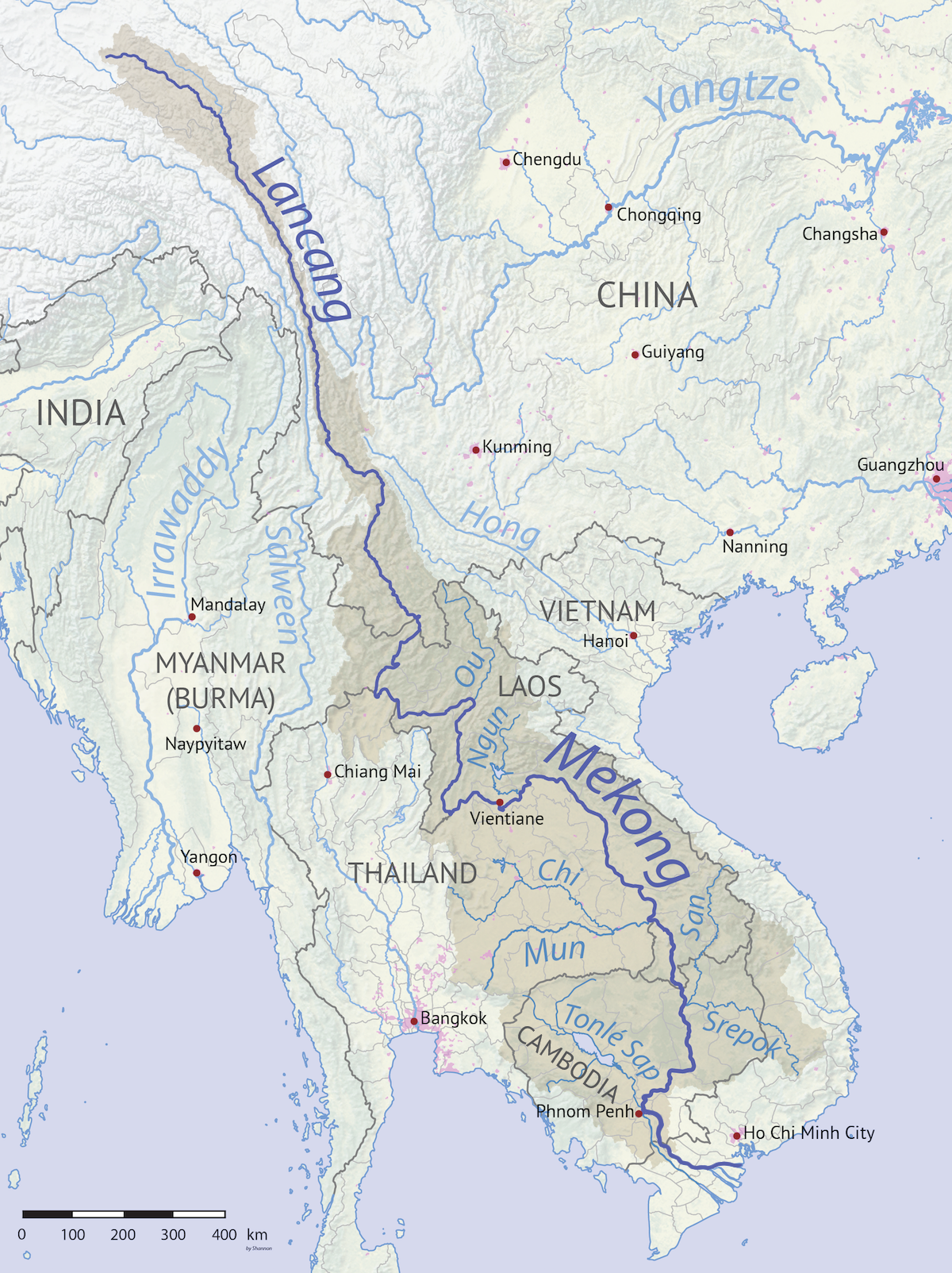
Paul Sidwell and Roger Blench propose that the Austroasiatic phylum dispersed via the Mekong River drainage basin.

Paul Sidwell (2009), in a lexicostatistical comparison of 36 languages that are well known enough to exclude loanwords, finds little evidence for internal branching, though he did find an area of increased contact between the Bahnaric and Katuic languages, such that languages of all branches apart from the geographically distant Munda and Nicobarese show greater similarity to Bahnaric and Katuic the closer they are to those branches, without any noticeable innovations common to Bahnaric and Katuic.

He therefore takes the conservative view that the thirteen branches of Austroasiatic should be treated as equidistant on current evidence. Sidwell & Blench (2011) discuss this proposal in more detail, and note that there is good evidence for a Khasi–Palaungic node, which could also possibly be closely related to Khmuic.

If this would be the case, Sidwell & Blench suggest that Khasic may have been an early offshoot of Palaungic that had spread westward. Sidwell & Blench (2011) suggest Shompen as an additional branch, and believe that a Vieto-Katuic connection is worth investigating. In general, however, the family is thought to have diversified too quickly for a deeply nested structure to have developed, since Proto-Austroasiatic speakers are believed by Sidwell to have radiated out from the central Mekong river valley relatively quickly.

Subsequently, Sidwell (2015a: 179) proposed that Nicobarese subgroups with Aslian, just as how Khasian and Palaungic subgroup with each other.

- Austroasiatic: Mon–Khmer
  - Munda
  - Khasi–Palaungic
    - Khasian
    - Palaungic
  - Khmuic
  - Mang (Note: Earlier classifications by Sidwell had lumped Mang and Pakanic together into a Mangic subgroup, but Sidwell currently considers Mang and Pakanic to each be independent branches of Austroasiatic.)
  - Pakanic
  - Vietic
  - Katuic
  - Bahnaric
  - Khmer
  - Pearic
  - Aslian–Monic
    - Monic
    - Aslian
  - - Nicobarese
    - ?Shompen

A subsequent computational phylogenetic analysis (Sidwell 2015b) suggests that Austroasiatic branches may have a loosely nested structure rather than a completely rake-like structure, with an east–west division (consisting of Munda, Khasic, Palaungic, and Khmuic forming a western group as opposed to all of the other branches) occurring possibly as early as 7,000 years before present. However, he still considers the subbranching dubious.

Integrating computational phylogenetic linguistics with recent archaeological findings, Paul Sidwell (2015c) further expanded his Mekong riverine hypothesis by proposing that Austroasiatic had ultimately expanded into Mainland Southeast Asia from the neighboring Lingnan area of southern China, with the subsequent Mekong riverine dispersal taking place after the initial arrival of Neolithic farmers from southern China.

Sidwell (2015c) tentatively suggests that Austroasiatic may have begun to split up 5,000 years BP during the Neolithic transition era of mainland Southeast Asia, with all the major branches of Austroasiatic formed by 4,000 BP. Austroasiatic would have had two possible dispersal routes from the western periphery of the Pearl River watershed of Lingnan, which would have been either a coastal route down the coast of Vietnam, or downstream through the Mekong River via Yunnan. Both the reconstructed lexicon of Proto-Austroasiatic and the archaeological record clearly show that early Austroasiatic speakers around 4,000 BP cultivated rice and millet, kept livestock such as dogs, pigs, and chickens, and thrived mostly in estuarine rather than coastal environments.

At 4,500 BP, this "Neolithic package" suddenly arrived in Mainland Southeast Asia from the neighboring Lingnan area without cereal grains and displaced the earlier pre-Neolithic hunter-gatherer cultures, with grain husks found in northern Mainland Southeast Asia by 4,100 BP and in southern Mainland Southeast Asia by 3,800 BP. However, Sidwell (2015c) found that iron is not reconstructable in Proto-Austroasiatic, since each Austroasiatic branch has different terms for iron that had been borrowed relatively lately from Tai, Chinese, Tibetan, Malay, and other languages.

During the Iron Age about 2,500 BP, relatively young Austroasiatic branches in Mainland Southeast Asia such as Vietic, Katuic, Pearic, and Khmer were formed, while the more internally diverse Bahnaric branch (dating to about 3,000 BP) underwent more extensive internal diversification. By the Iron Age, all of the Austroasiatic branches were more or less in their present-day locations, with most of the diversification within Austroasiatic taking place during the Iron Age.

Paul Sidwell (2018) considers the Austroasiatic language family to have rapidly diversified around 4,000 years BP during the arrival of rice agriculture in Mainland Southeast Asia, but notes that the origin of Proto-Austroasiatic itself is older than that date. The lexicon of Proto-Austroasiatic can be divided into an early and late stratum. The early stratum consists of basic lexicon including body parts, animal names, natural features, and pronouns, while the names of cultural items (agriculture terms and words for cultural artifacts, which are reconstructible in Proto-Austroasiatic) form part of the later stratum.

Roger Blench (2017) suggests that vocabulary related to aquatic subsistence strategies (such as boats, waterways, river fauna, and fish capture techniques) can be reconstructed for Proto-Austroasiatic. Blench (2017) finds widespread Austroasiatic roots for 'river, valley', 'boat', 'fish', 'catfish sp.', 'eel', 'prawn', 'shrimp' (Central Austroasiatic), 'crab', 'tortoise', 'turtle', 'otter', 'crocodile', 'heron, fishing bird', and 'fish trap'. Archaeological evidence for the presence of agriculture in northern Mainland Southeast Asia (northern Vietnam, Laos, and other nearby areas) dates back to only about 4,000 years ago (2,000 BC), with agriculture ultimately being introduced from further up to the north in the Yangtze valley where it has been dated to 6,000 BP.

Sidwell (2022) proposes that the locus of Proto-Austroasiatic was in the Red River Delta area about 4,000-4,500 years before present, instead of the Middle Mekong as he had previously proposed. Austroasiatic dispersed coastal maritime routes and also upstream through river valleys. Khmuic, Palaungic, and Khasic resulted from a westward dispersal that ultimately came from the Red River valley. Based on their current distributions, about half of all Austroasiatic branches (including Nicobaric and Munda) can be traced to coastal maritime dispersals.

Hence, this points to a relatively late riverine dispersal of Austroasiatic as compared to Sino-Tibetan, whose speakers had a distinct non-riverine culture. In addition to living an aquatic-based lifestyle, early Austroasiatic speakers would have also had access to livestock, crops, and newer types of watercraft. As early Austroasiatic speakers dispersed rapidly via waterways, they would have encountered speakers of older language families who were already settled in the area, such as Sino-Tibetan.

=== Sidwell (2018) ===
Sidwell (2018) (quoted in Sidwell 2021) gives a more nested classification of Austroasiatic branches as suggested by his computational phylogenetic analysis of Austroasiatic languages using a 200-word list. Many of the tentative groupings are likely linkages. Pakanic and Shompen were not included.

- Austroasiatic
  - Eastern
    - - Bahnaric
      - Vietic–Katuic
        - Vietic
        - Katuic
    - - Khmeric
      - Pearic
  - Mang
  - Northern
    - Khmuic
    - Khasi–Palaungic
      - Khasian
      - Palaungic
  - Monic
  - Southern
    - Nicobarese
    - Aslian
  - Munda

=== Possible extinct branches ===
Roger Blench (2009) also proposes that there might have been other primary branches of Austroasiatic that are now extinct, based on substrate evidence in modern-day languages.

- Pre-Chamic languages (the languages of coastal Vietnam before the Chamic migrations). Chamic has various Austroasiatic loanwords that cannot be clearly traced to existing Austroasiatic branches (Sidwell 2006, 2007). Larish (1999) also notes that Moklenic languages contain many Austroasiatic loanwords, some of which are similar to the ones found in Chamic.
- Acehnese substratum (Sidwell 2006). Acehnese has many basic words that are of Austroasiatic origin, suggesting that either Austronesian speakers have absorbed earlier Austroasiatic residents in northern Sumatra, or that words might have been borrowed from Austroasiatic languages in southern Vietnam – or perhaps a combination of both. Sidwell (2006) argues that Acehnese and Chamic had often borrowed Austroasiatic words independently of each other, while some Austroasiatic words can be traced back to Proto-Aceh-Chamic. Sidwell (2006) accepts that Acehnese and Chamic are related, but that they had separated from each other before Chamic had borrowed most of its Austroasiatic lexicon.
- Bornean substrate languages (Blench 2010). Blench cites words of Austroasiatic origin in some of the modern-day Bornean languages such as Land Dayak (Bidayuh, Dayak Bakatiq, etc.), Dusunic (Central Dusun, Visayan, etc.), Kayan, and Kenyah, noting especially resemblances with Aslian. As further evidence for his proposal, Blench also cites ethnographic evidence such as musical instruments in Borneo shared in common with Austroasiatic-speaking groups in mainland Southeast Asia. Adelaar (1995) has also noticed phonological and lexical similarities between Land Dayak and Aslian. Kaufman (2018) presents dozens of lexical comparisons showing similarities between various Bornean and Austroasiatic languages.
- Lepcha substratum ("Rongic"). Many words of Austroasiatic origin have been noticed in Lepcha, suggesting a Sino-Tibetan superstrate laid over an Austroasiatic substrate. Blench (2013) calls this branch "Rongic" based on the Lepcha autonym Róng.

Other languages with proposed Austroasiatic substrata are:

- Jiamao, based on evidence from the register system of Jiamao, a Hlai language (Thurgood 1992). Jiamao is known for its highly aberrant vocabulary in relation to other Hlai languages.
- Kerinci: van Reijn (1974) notes that Kerinci, a Malayic language of central Sumatra, shares many phonological similarities with Austroasiatic languages, such as sesquisyllabic word structure and vowel inventory.

John Peterson (2017) suggests that "pre-Munda" (early languages related to Proto-Munda) languages may have once dominated the eastern Indo-Gangetic Plain, and were then absorbed by Indo-Aryan languages at an early date as Indo-Aryan spread east. Peterson notes that eastern Indo-Aryan languages display many morphosyntactic features similar to those of Munda languages, while western Indo-Aryan languages do not.

== Writing systems ==
Other than Latin-based alphabets, many Austroasiatic languages are written with the Khmer, Thai, Lao, and Burmese alphabets. Vietnamese divergently had an indigenous script based on Chinese logographic writing. This has since been supplanted by the Latin alphabet in the 20th century. The following are examples of past-used alphabets or current alphabets of Austroasiatic languages.

- Chữ Nôm (Used until replaced by Chữ Quốc ngữ (Vietnamese alphabet) in the 20th century)
- Khmer alphabet
- Khom script (Used by indigenous languages in Laos for a short period in the early 20th century)
- Old Mon script
- Mon script
- Pahawh Hmong (Once used to write Khmu, under the name "Pahawh Khmu")
- Tai Le (Palaung, Blang)
- Tai Tham (Blang)
- Ol Chiki alphabet (Santali alphabet)
- Mundari Bani (Mundari alphabet)
- Warang Citi (Ho alphabet)
- Ol Onal (Bhumij alphabet)
- Sorang Sompeng alphabet (Sora alphabet)

== Lexicon ==
=== Numerals ===
Austroasiatic numerals
| Number | Santali | Korku | Gtaʔ | Sora | Bugan | Bolyu | U | Mon | Bahnar | Vietnamese | Ruc | Khmer | Amwi | Semelai | Mlabri |
|---|---|---|---|---|---|---|---|---|---|---|---|---|---|---|---|
| One | mitˀ | miyaˀ | mwiŋ | mi- | mə⁵⁵ | mə³³ | mò | mwaj | muːɲ | một | moic⁵ | muəj | mi | muj | mɔj |
| Two | bar | bari | mbar | bagu | bi³¹ | mbi⁵⁵ | ʔá | baː | ɓaːr | hai | haːl¹ | pìː | ʔɨ̃ | duwaʔ | bær |
| Three | pɛ | apʰai | ndʒi | jagi | pt͡se³¹ | paːi⁵⁵ | wáj | peːŋ | pɔeʔ | ba | paː¹ | baj | lɛ | hmpeʔ | pɛʔ |
| Four | pon | upun | õ | undʒi | pau³³ | puːn⁵³ | pʰón | pɔn | pwan | bốn | poːn³ | buan | sia | hmpon | pon |
| Five | mɔɽɛ̃ | monoi | malwe | mɔnlɔj | mi³³ | me³¹ | sàt | pəsɔn | pəɗam | năm | dam¹ | pram | san | msɔŋ | thɤɤŋ |
| Six | tərui | turu | tur | tudru | pio³³ | pju⁵³ | ntʰò | karaɔ | tədrəw | sáu | ʃraːw³ | – | tʰrəw | pruʔ | thaal |
| Seven | eae | ei | gu | guldʒi | pou³¹ | pei⁵⁵ | mpʰùn | hapɔh | təpəh | bảy | paj⁶ | – | hntʰlɛ | tmpɔh | gul |
| Eight | iral | ilar | tma | tamdʒi | sã³³ | saːm⁵³ | tʰà | həcam | təhŋaːm | tám | tʰaːm³ | – | hnpʔũ | – | tiiʔ |
| Nine | arɛ | are | sõtiŋ | tindʒi | ɕi³¹ | ɕən⁵³ | tʰìp | həcit | təsin | chín | ɕiːn³ | – | hnʃʔɛ | – | gaːjh |
| Ten | gɛl | gel | gwa | gəlzi | ʑu³¹ | maːn¹³ | t͡sʰò | cɔh | ɟit | mười | mɯəj² | – | ʃipʰua | – | gal |

== External relations ==
=== Austric languages ===
Austroasiatic is an integral part of the controversial Austric hypothesis, which also includes the Austronesian languages, and in some proposals also the Kra–Dai languages and the Hmong–Mien languages.

=== Hmong–Mien ===
Several lexical resemblances are found between the Hmong–Mien and Austroasiatic language families (Ratliff 2010), some of which had earlier been proposed by Haudricourt (1951). This could imply a relation or early language contact along the Yangtze.

According to Cai (et al. 2011), Hmong–Mien people are genetically related to Austroasiatic speakers, while the Hmong–Mien languages were heavily influenced by Sino-Tibetan, especially Tibeto-Burman languages.

=== Indo-Aryan languages ===
It is suggested that the Austroasiatic languages have some influence on Indo-Aryan languages including Sanskrit and middle Indo-Aryan languages. Indian linguist Suniti Kumar Chatterji pointed that a specific number of substantives in languages such as Hindi, Punjabi and Bengali were borrowed from Munda languages. Additionally, French linguist Jean Przyluski suggested a similarity between the tales from the Austroasiatic realm and the Indian mythological stories of Matsyagandha (Satyavati from Mahabharata) and the Nāgas.

== Austroasiatic migrations and archaeogenetics ==
Mitsuru Sakitani suggests that Haplogroup O1b1, which is common in Austroasiatic people and some other ethnic groups in southern China, and haplogroup O1b2, which is common in today's Japanese and Koreans, are the carriers of early rice agriculture from southern China. Another study suggests that the haplogroup O1b1 is the major Austroasiatic paternal lineage and O1b2 the "para-Austroasiatic" lineage of the Koreans and Yayoi people.

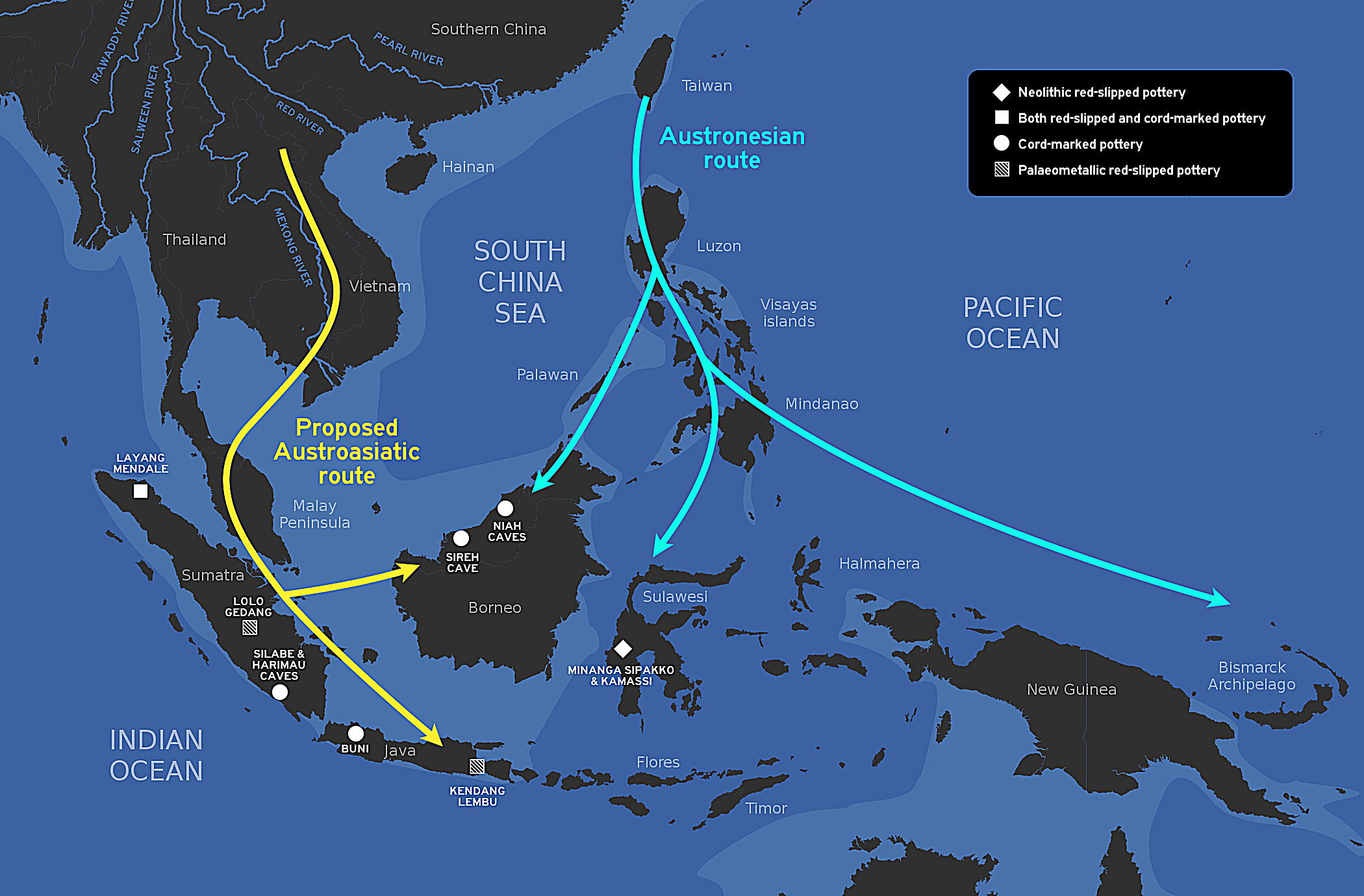
The Austroasiatic migration route began earlier than the Austronesian expansion, but later migrations of Austronesians resulted in the assimilation of the pre-Austronesian Austroasiatic populations.

A full genomic study by Lipson et al. (2018) identified a characteristic lineage that can be associated with the spread of Austroasiatic languages in Southeast Asia and that can be traced back to remains of Neolithic farmers from Mán Bạc (c. 2000 BCE) in the Red River Delta in northern Vietnam, and to closely related Ban Chiang and Vat Komnou remains in Thailand and Cambodia respectively. This Austroasiatic lineage can be modeled as primarily a sister group of the Austronesian lineage with significant ancestry (ca. 30%) from a deeply diverging eastern Eurasian source (modeled by the authors as sharing some genetic drift with the Onge, a modern Andamanese hunter-gatherer group), and which is ancestral to modern Austroasiatic-speaking groups of Southeast Asia such as the Mlabri and the Nicobarese, and partially to the Austroasiatic Munda-speaking groups of South Asia (e.g. the Juang). Significant levels of Austroasiatic ancestry were also found in Austronesian-speaking groups of Sumatra, Java, and Borneo. (Note: Austroasiatic-related ancestry had been detected before also in other ethnic groups of the Sunda Islands (e.g. Javanese, Sundanese, and Manggarai).)

Liu et al. (2020) models sampled Austroasiatic groups from Mainland Southeast Asia as descended from a lineage related to the ancestors of East Asian groups and a lineage related to the ancestors of Hoabinhian hunter-gatherers. Austroasiatic groups cluster with each other except for Kinh Vietnamese and Muong, who share more drift with Kra–Dai and Hmong–Mien groups. However, there is evidence of local Austroasiatic input in the Kinh Vietnamese genome. Austroasiatic groups from Southern China, such as the Wa and Blang in Yunnan, predominantly carry the same Mainland Southeast Asian Neolithic farmer ancestry but with additional geneflow from northern and southern East Asian lineages, indicating Tibeto-Burman and Kra–Dai influence respectively.

Huang et al. (2020) suggests the "core Austroasiatic" population may possibly have been present in Southwest China, who derive most of their ancestry from Mekong Neolithic (58.0%–75.2%) instead of Late Neolithic Fujian, which is more common for the "core Austronesian" population. Austroasiatic-related ancestry is widespread in Mainland Southeast Asians and Hmong–Mien groups from Southern China but for the latter, there is evidence of Kra–Dai geneflow, which increases in groups that live further east. This admixture is also present in Mainland Southeast Asia. Yangshao culture-related populations, who contributed to the ancestries of present Sino-Tibetan populations, likewise derive their southern East Asian ancestry from Mekong Neolithic (32.2 ± 5.9%).

According to Mishra et al. (2024), modern Nicobarese have one of the highest levels of Austroasiatic-related ancestry among sampled populations. This genetic component is found in Austroasiatic populations from South Asia and Southeast Asia. Another study from 2024, Ahlawat et al., found that the Austroasiatic tribes — Ho, Bathudi, Bhumij and Mahali from the eastern Indian state of Odisha do not exhibit substantial West Eurasian mtDNA unlike the Dravidian-speaking groups from southern India, and cluster closely with the other Austroasiatic populations of South Asia.

Wang et al. (2025) states that modern Austroasiatic groups are genetically similar to populations found in Central Yunnan during the Late Neolithic period, represented by the Late Neolithic Xingyi individual. This individual has, relative to Basal Asians, a closer genetic relationship with the Northern East Asian Boshan and the Southern East Asian Qihe3, but is distinct from them. This individual does not exhibit Basal Asian Xingyi-related ancestry, represented by the Early Neolithic Xingyi individual and found in ancient Tibetans, suggesting significant demographic replacement. The relationship between Austroasiatic and Central Yunnan populations suggests that the Red River valley may have mediated the expansion of Proto-Austroasiatic ancestry. Regardless, Wang et al. conclude that Central Yunnan populations have ancestry that is found in present Austroasiatic groups, as well as ancient populations from Vietnam and Laos about 4000 to 3000 years ago (i.e. Vt_G2 and La_G2). Proto-Austroasiatic populations are also likely to have diverged from other East Eurasian populations at least 19,000 years ago.

Yin et al. (2026) states that modern Austroasiatic-speaking populations from Mainland Southeast Asia have different affinities to ancient populations of the region from various time periods. For example, modern Eastern Mon–Khmer (e.g. Katuic, Khmeric, Pearic) and Southern Monic speakers have close affinities with Neolithic Hon Hai Co Tien and Tam Pa Ling populations, who have substantial Hoabinhian ancestry. Northern Mon–Khmer (e.g. Khmuic, Mang, Palaungic) speakers, in contrast, have close affinities with Iron Age Mainland Southeast Asian populations. Vietic (Viet–Muong) speakers are likewise cladal with Iron Age and Historical Mainland Southeast Asian populations.

=== Migration into India ===
According to Chaubey et al., "Austro-Asiatic speakers in India today are derived from dispersal from Southeast Asia, followed by extensive sex-specific admixture with local Indian populations." According to Riccio et al., the Munda peoples are likely descended from Austroasiatic migrants from Southeast Asia.

== Sources ==
- Adams, K. L. (1989). Systems of numeral classification in the Mon–Khmer, Nicobarese and Aslian subfamilies of Austroasiatic. Canberra, A.C.T., Australia: Dept. of Linguistics, Research School of Pacific Studies, Australian National University. ISBN 0-85883-373-5
- Alves, Mark J. (2014). "Mon-Khmer". In Rochelle Lieber; Pavel Stekauer (eds.). The Oxford Handbook of Derivational Morphology. Oxford: Oxford University Press. pp. 520–544.
- Alves, Mark J. (2015). Morphological functions among Mon-Khmer languages: beyond the basics. In N. J. Enfield & Bernard Comrie (eds.), Languages of Mainland Southeast Asia: the state of the art. Berlin: de Gruyter Mouton, 531–557.
- Bradley, David (2012). "Languages and Language Families in China Archived 30 April 2017 at the Wayback Machine", in Rint Sybesma (ed.), Encyclopedia of Chinese Language and Linguistics.
- Chakrabarti, Byomkes. (1994). A Comparative Study of Santali and Bengali.
- Chaubey, G.; et al. (2010). "Population Genetic Structure in Indian Austroasiatic Speakers: The Role of Landscape Barriers and Sex-Specific Admixture". Mol Biol Evol. 28 (2): 1013–1024. doi:10.1093/molbev/msq288. PMC 3355372. PMID 20978040.
- Diffloth, Gérard. (2005). "The contribution of linguistic palaeontology and Austro-Asiatic". in Laurent Sagart, Roger Blench and Alicia Sanchez-Mazas, eds. The Peopling of East Asia: Putting Together Archaeology, Linguistics and Genetics. 77–80. London: Routledge Curzon. ISBN 0-415-32242-1
- Filbeck, D. (1978). T'in: a historical study. Pacific linguistics, no. 49. Canberra: Dept. of Linguistics, Research School of Pacific Studies, Australian National University. ISBN 0-85883-172-4
- Hemeling, K. (1907). Die Nanking Kuanhua. (German language)
- Jenny, Mathias and Paul Sidwell, eds (2015). The Handbook of Austroasiatic Languages Archived 5 March 2015 at the Wayback Machine. Leiden: Brill.
- Peck, B. M., Comp. (1988). An Enumerative Bibliography of South Asian Language Dictionaries.
- Peiros, Ilia. 1998. Comparative Linguistics in Southeast Asia. Pacific Linguistics Series C, No. 142. Canberra: Australian National University.
- Shorto, Harry L. edited by Sidwell, Paul, Cooper, Doug and Bauer, Christian (2006). A Mon–Khmer comparative dictionary Archived 9 August 2018 at the Wayback Machine. Canberra: Australian National University. Pacific Linguistics. ISBN 0-85883-570-3
- Shorto, H. L. Bibliographies of Mon–Khmer and Tai Linguistics. London oriental bibliographies, v. 2. London: Oxford University Press, 1963.
- Sidwell, Paul (2005). "Proto-Katuic Phonology and the Sub-grouping of Mon–Khmer Languages" (PDF). In Paul Sidwell (ed.). SEALSXV: papers from the 15th meeting of the Southeast Asian Linguistic Society. Canberra: Pacific Linguistics. Archived (PDF) from the original on 9 October 2022.
- Sidwell, Paul (2009). Classifying the Austroasiatic languages: history and state of the art. LINCOM studies in Asian linguistics. Vol. 76. Munich: Lincom Europa. ISBN 978-3-929075-67-0. Archived from the original on 24 March 2019.
- Sidwell, Paul (2010). "The Austroasiatic central riverine hypothesis" (PDF). Journal of Language Relationship. 4: 117–134. Archived (PDF) from the original on 30 January 2022.
- van Driem, George. (2007). Austroasiatic phylogeny and the Austroasiatic homeland in light of recent population genetic studies. Mon-Khmer Studies, 37, 1–14.
- Zide, Norman H., and Milton E. Barker. (1966) Studies in Comparative Austroasiatic Linguistics, The Hague: Mouton (Indo-Iranian monographs, v. 5.).
- Zhang; et al. (2015). "Y-chromosome diversity suggests southern origin and Paleolithic backwave migration of Austro-Asiatic speakers from eastern Asia to the Indian subcontinent". Scientific Reports. 5 15486: 1548. Bibcode:2015NatSR...515486Z. doi:10.1038/srep15486. PMC 4611482. PMID 26482917.
