= Kolarian =

Kolarian is a word first used by George Campbell for Munda languages. He described it as one of the three non-Aryan language families of India, along with the Tibeto-Burman and the Dravidian. It is a branch of Austro-asiatic languages spoken in the eastern regions of the Indians subcontinent, and is also known as Munda languages. Its not a single tribal language but a group of tribal family languages. The speakers are called Kolarian tribes.

The following languages belong to the group:

- Asur language (Asuri language)
- Bhumij language
- Birhor language
- Bonda language
- Gutob language (Gadaba language)
- Ho language
- Juang language
- Kharia language
- Koda language (Kora language)
- Kol language (Bangladesh)
- Korku language
- Korwa language
- Mundari language
- Santali language
- Sora language (Savara language)
