= Kherwarian languages =

Austroasiatic language family

Kherwarian
- Geographic distribution: India, Bangladesh, Nepal, Bhutan
- Linguistic classification: Austroasiatic: Munda; North Munda; Kherwarian
- Proto-language: Proto-Kherwarian
- Subdivisions: Santalic; Mundaric

Language codes
- Glottolog: kher1245
- Approximate locations and distribution of the Kherwarian languages

The Kherwarian languages consist of non-Korku North Munda languages that are mainly spoken in Eastern Indian states of Jharkhand, West Bengal, Bihar, Odisha, Chhattisgarh and neighboring countries of Bangladesh, Nepal, and Bhutan. Together, Korku and the Kherwarian language continuum form the conventional North Munda branch of the Austroasiatic language family.

The Dravidian-speaking Kurukh people in Ranchi suburbs have adopted a creolized dialect of Kherwarian Mundari called Keraʔ Mundari. Its verbal morphology is less complex than an average Austroasiatic Kherwarian language.

== Typology ==
Vowel harmony in Kherwarian affixes yields some differences depending on the nature of the vowel of the verb stem, while others do not. There are harmonic and non-harmonic affixes. In phonological lexical words, disyllables have certain vowel restrictions.

Stress is fixedly released at the second syllable. LH (weak-strong) prosodic word pattern is pervasive even in morphological words. Unlike Korku, the Kherwarian languages lack phonemic tones, giving a good reason for the Korku-Kherwarian classification of North Munda.

The Kherwarian languages, and to some extent, Korku and Kharia, also seems to lack discrete evidence for the existence of the usual parts of speech categories such as nouns, verbs, adjectives. One lexeme can do all the functions without any kind of morphological derivation.

Like many other Munda languages, the Kherwarian languages are pronominalized languages with complex verbal agreement systems. Double- and triple agreements, even with indexation of an possessor of the logical object or subject are possible. However, the ability to index a third argument is restricted to the Santali-esque languages such as Santali, Karmali, Mahali, and particular Santalized varieties of Ho, and the Mundari-esque languages do not. In some languages such as Kɔɖa, Turi, Birhor, the status of subject markers seems to be intermediate between suffix and clitic, suggesting a third subtype of Kherwarian.

1). Ho

sab-ke-d-kin-a=le
catch.hold.of-ACT.AOR-TR-3DU.OBJ-FIN=1PL.SUBJ
'we seized them two'

2). Santali

hɔpɔn=e idi-ke-d-e-tiɲ-a
son=3SG.SUBJ take.away-ACT.AOR-TR-3SG.OBJ-POSS.1SG-FIN
'he took away my son'

3). Ho (Mayurbhanj dialect)

tʃa=n em-a-ɲ-me
tea=1 give-APPL-1-2
'give me tea'

Table below summarizes nominal markings using cases and postpositions in Kherwarian lects and Korku:

	Accusative	Dative	Oblique	Genitive	Instrumental	Comitative	Locative	Ablative	Allative
Santali		-ʈʰɛn		-ren/-ak/-rɛak	-tɛ	-ʈʰɛn/-ʈʰɛtʃ	-rɛ	-kʰon	-sen/-setʃ
Mundari	(naŋgen)		-ke	-aʔ	-te		-re	-ate	
Keraʔ Mundari	-ke	-ta/-ke		-aʔ/-raʔ		-loŋ	-re	-se	
Ho				-ren/-aʔ/-re-aʔ	-te	-loʔ	-re	-(e)te	-te
Bhumij				-ren	-te	-lo	-re	-ate	-te
Birhor			-ke	-a/-ʈʰi(n)/-ren	-te	-lo	-re	-te	-te
Korku	-khè	-kʰè		-à(ʔ)	-ten	-gon	-èn	-àten/-tan/-te	-ʈae

Proto-North Munda indexation clitics were reconstructed by Pinnow (1966), Anderson & Zide (2001), and Anderson (2007). Below is a chart showcasing reconstructions by Anderson (2007) and their modern reflex forms (subject/agent):

Kherwarian pronominal clitics
	1SG	1DU.INCL	1DU.EXCL	1PL.INCL	1PL.EXCL	2SG	2DU	2PL	3SG	3DU	3PL	INAN
Santali	=(i)ɲ	=laŋ	=liɲ	=bo(n)	=le	=m(e)	=ben	=pe	=e/=i	=kin	=ko	-i/-e
Mundari	=ɲ	=laŋ	=liŋ	=bu	=le	=m(e)	=ben	=pe	=e/=i/=eʔ/=iʔ	=kiŋ	=ko	-Ø
Keraʔ Mundari	=(i)ɲ	=laŋ	=liŋ	=bu	=le	=(e)m(e)	=b(e)n	=pe	=e/=i/=iʔ	=kin	=ku	-e/aʔ
Ho	=iɲ	=laŋ	=liɲ	=bu	=le	=m	=ben	=pe	=e/=i/=ʔ/=eʔ/=Ø	=kiɲ	=ku	-e
Asuri	=iŋ/=n	=(a)laŋ	=(a)liŋ	=(a)bu	=(a)le	=(a)m	=(a)ben	=(a)pe	=(a)e	=(a)kin	=(a)ku	-Ø
Birhor	=iŋ/=ĩ	=laŋ	=liŋ	=bu	=le	=m/=me	=ben	=pe	=e	=kin	=ku	-Ø
Kɔɖa	=iŋ	=laŋ	=liŋ	=bu	=lɛ	=m/=p	=bɛn	=pɛ	=ɛ	=kin	=ku	-Ø
Turi	=ɛŋ/=ɲ(iɲ)	=laŋ	=liɲ	=pu	=lɛ	=m/=p	=bin	=pɛ	=ɛ	=kin	=ku	-Ø
Proto-North Munda	=iɲ/=iŋ	=laŋ	=liŋ	=bu	=le	=me	=ben	=pe	=e/=idʒ	=kiɲ/kiŋ	=ku/=ko	

== Innovations ==
Low-level subgroup innovations of the Kherwarian languages include:

- Active voice *-ˀt
- Causative -ocho, -ichi & -rika

== Interaction with neighboring languages ==
Regional Indo-Aryan languages such as Khortha, Sadri, and Kurmali have been observed as parts of a Jharkhandi sprachbund with the Kherwarian lects, mainly cited to intense language contact and high degree of multilingualism.

== Languages ==
- Santali
  - Mahali
  - Karmali
- Mundari
  - Keraʔ Mundari (Kurukh creole)
- Ho
- Koda
- Korwa
- Koraku
- Kol
- Asuri
- Bhumij
- Turi
- Birhor
- Majhwar
- Bijori?
- Agariya?

== Sources ==
- Anderson, Gregory D. S. (2007). The Munda verb: typological perspectives. Trends in linguistics. Vol. 174. Berlin: Mouton de Gruyter. ISBN 978-3-11-018965-0.
- Jora, Bikram; Anderson, Gregory D. S. (2020). "Proto-Kherwarian Negation, TAM and Person-Indexing Interdependencies". In Jenny, Mathias; Sidwell, Paul; Alves, Mark (eds.). Austroasiatic Syntax in Areal and Diachronic Perspective. Brill. pp. 236–257. doi:10.1163/9789004425606_008.
- Osada, Toshiki (1996). "Notes on the Proto-Kherwarian vowel system". Indo-Iranian Journal. 39: 245–258. doi:10.1007/BF00161864.
- Osada, Toshiki (2008). "Mundari". The Munda Languages. New York: Routledge. pp. 99–164. ISBN 0-415-32890-X.
- Kobayashi, Masato; Murmu, Ganesh (2008). "Keraʔ Mundari". The Munda Languages. New York: Routledge. pp. 165–194. ISBN 0-415-32890-X.
- Anderson, Gregory D. S.; Osada, Toshiki; Harrison, K. David (2008). "Ho and The Other Kherwarian Languages". The Munda Languages. New York: Routledge. pp. 195–255. ISBN 0-415-32890-X.
- Anderson, Gregory D. S. (2014). "Overview of the Munda languages". In Jenny, Mathias; Sidwell, Paul (eds.). The Handbook of Austroasiatic Languages. Leiden: Brill. pp. 364–414. doi:10.1163/9789004283572_006. ISBN 978-90-04-28295-7.
- Anderson, Gregory D. S.; Jora, Bikram (2021a). "Introduction to the templatic verb morphology of Birhor (Birhoɽ), a Kherwarian Munda language". Language and Linguistics. 22 (1): 1–27. doi:10.1075/lali.00076.and.
- Anderson, Gregory D. S.; Jora, Bikram (2021b). "Typologically Quirky Characteristics of Past and Perfective Forms in Kherwarian". In Mohan, Shailendra (ed.). Advances in Munda Linguistics. Cambridge Scholars Publishing. pp. 151–169. ISBN 1527570479.
- Sidwell, Paul; Rau, Felix (2014). "Austroasiatic Comparative-Historical Reconstruction: An Overview". In Jenny, Mathias; Sidwell, Paul (eds.). The Handbook of Austroasiatic Languages. Leiden: Brill. pp. 221–363. ISBN 978-90-04-28295-7.
- Anderson, Gregory D. S.; Jora, Bikram (2023). "A Typology of Grammatical, Local/Directional and Instrumental Markers in Kherwarian Languages". In Ring, Hiram; Sidwell, Paul (eds.). Papers from the Eighth International Conference on Austroasiatic Linguistics. JSEALS Special Publication No. 11. University of Hawai'i Press. pp. 1–14.
- Peterson, John M. (2010). "Language contact in Jharkhand: Linguistic convergence between Munda and Indo-Aryan in eastern-central India". Himalayan Linguistics. 9 (2): 56–86. doi:10.5070/H99223479.
- Peterson, John M. (2017). "Jharkhand as a 'Linguistic Area': Language Contact Between Indo-Aryan and Munda in Eastern-Central South Asia". In Hickey, Raymond (ed.). The Cambridge Handbook of Areal Linguistics. Cambridge University Press. pp. 551–574. doi:10.1017/9781107279872.021.
- Kobayashi, Masato; Tirkey, Bablu (2017). The Kurux Language: Grammar, Texts and Lexicon. Brill. ISBN 9789004347663.
