= Parenga =

Indigenous ethnic group of Odisha, India

- A Parenga man shares how he and his family code-switch between Gorum, Desia and Odia

Regions with significant populations
- India
- Odisha: 9,445

Languages
- Gorum

Related ethnic groups
- Gadaba, Bonda and other Munda peoples

Parenga (also spelled Perengi) or Gorum people are an Indigenous community and Scheduled Tribe of the Indian state of Odisha, primarily living in the districts of Koraput and Malkangiri. The Odisha government refers to them as a sub‑tribe of the Gadaba within the Munda group of tribes. The Parenga people speak the Gorum language, which belongs to the South Munda branch of the Munda languages.

== Etymology ==
According to Parenga oral annals, the ethnonym "Peranga" or "Parenga" is derived from the term "kerang", referring to a plant fibre historically used by the community to make clothing and other apparels.

The autonym gorum consists of two segments: a prefix gV-, apparently a fossilized classifier denoting living things, and the root -rum that may be semantically ascribed to either "human" or "cat" (cf. Gorum rumaŋ "cat", Gutob girem "cat").

== Distribution and population ==
A native speaker discussing in 2026 the challenges in teaching Gorum to children

The Parenga are mainly concentrated in Nandapur and Lamtaput areas of Koraput district, with additional settlements in parts of Malkangiri, Kalahandi, Sundargarh and Balangir districts of Odisha. As per the 2011 Census of India, their population in Odisha is reported as 9,445 persons, including 4,532 males and 4,913 females. They are recognised as a Scheduled Tribe in Odisha, and are sometimes grouped statistically with other small Munda‑speaking communities of southern Odisha. The Parenga consider the Gadaba people their "brothers", for being their neighbouring Indigenous group.

== Language ==
The Parenga speak their native, Gorum language, South Munda language within the Austroasiatic language family. Gorum is closely associated with the Sora–Gorum subgroup in standard classifications of Munda languages, and speakers are typically bilingual in regional lingua francas such as Desia and Telugu.

== Social organisation ==
Parenga society is organised into two main lineages, namely "Vaishya" and "Putuli", which are further subdivided into several groups such as "Ontal" (cobra), "Khara" (sun), "Khilla" (tiger), "Pangi" (vulture), "Khinbudi" (bear), "Machha" (fish) and "Golari" (snake). These castes play a role in social identity and marriage regulation.

The typical Parenga household is described as nuclear, patrilocal, patrilineal and patripotestal, with authority centred on the senior male. Families are predominantly monogamous, although the broader kin network remains important for economic cooperation and ritual obligations.
