= Birhor =

Birhor may refer to:

- the Birhor people
- the Birhor language
