= Gorum language =

Endangered Munda language of India

Gorum
- Parengi
- ଗୋରୁମ୍
- A native speaker discussing in 2026 the challenges in teaching the Gorum language to children
- Native to: India
- Region: Odisha, Andhra Pradesh
- Ethnicity: Parenga (9,445 in Odisha (2011 census))
- Native speakers: 20 (2011)
- Language family: Austroasiatic: Munda; South; Sora-Gorum; Gorum

Language codes
- ISO 639-3: pcj
- Glottolog: pare1266
- ELP: Gorum
- Coordinates: 18.8083°N 82.7083°E

Gorum (also Parengi) is a near-extinct minor Munda language of India, spoken by the Parenga people of Odisha state, eastern India.

== Names ==
The name Gorum most likely comes from an animal/people prefix go- and root -rum meaning 'people', and is possibly related to the ethnonym Remo.

"Parengi" or "Parenga" is of obscure origin.

== Status ==
Gorum is 60 percent endangered and may soon become extinct. Few people under the age of thirty years can understand the language, while those who do know it are likely to deny knowing it. This language seems to have been first researched in 1933. Ethnologue (2005) reports a literacy rate of just 11.5% which seemingly higher in Andhra Pradesh and lower in Odisha.

== Origins ==
Gorum is a member of the Munda family, as shown by the glottal consonants that are used in creaky voice. However, it may have borrowed some elements from nearby Dravidian languages, such as doubly inflected AVC structures. However, aside from local Dravidian languages, Limbu, a Tibeto-Burman language in Eastern Nepal also display doubly inflected AVCs, so does Burushaski in the northern periphery of South Asia.

== Distribution ==
Gorum speakers are located in the following areas of eastern India.

- Koraput district, Odisha: the former Nandapur and Pottangi taluks.
- Visakhapatnam district, Andhra Pradesh: Munchingput block.

Gutob is spoken to the north of Gorum, and Gta to the west of Gorum.

== Phonology ==
=== Consonants ===
In Gorum, palatal stops are completely replaced by fricatives /s/ and /z/. Stop aspiration and dental-retroflex distinction are also absent.

Gorum consonants
| | | Labial | Alveolar | Retroflex | Palatal | Velar | Glottal |
|---|---|---|---|---|---|---|---|
| Stop | voiceless | p | t | (ʈ) | | k | ʔ |
| Stop | voiced | b | d | (ɖ) | | ɡ | |
| Fricative | voiceless | | s | | | | |
| Fricative | voiced | | z | | | | |
| Nasal | | m | n | | | ŋ | |
| Lateral | | | l | | | | |
| Rhotic | | | r | ɽ | | | |
| Approximant | | | | | j | | |

=== Vowels ===
Gorum vowels
| | Front | Central | Back |
|---|---|---|---|
| Close | i [i, ɪ] | | u [u, ʊ] |
| Mid | e [e, ɛ] | | o [o, ɔ] |
| Open | | a [a] | |

Creaky voice in Gorum is part of the morphology, i.e. grammaticalized, to demonstrate the affectedness of the verb stems. Although it has been suggested that creaky voice is reconstructible in proto-Austroasiatic, Anderson (2007) raises possibilities of whether Gorum creaky voice is true archaicism or pseudo-archaism.

=== Word stress ===
Aze (1971) described that stress in generally found in word-final position in Gorum words produced in isolated utterances, while in nominal forms, stress falls in the penultimate syllable. In the case of verbal forms, the pattern may not be determined due to morpholexical complications.

== Morphology ==
=== Nominal morphology ===
==== Number ====
Gorum distinguishes two numbers on nominals: unmarked singular and plural -gi.

==== Person ====
Noun phrases are marked for possession. These possessive markers occur primarily with inalienable nouns, i.e. body parts, kin terms, and some lexical terms that are socioculturally determined to be inalienable like irrigated rice fields.

| | Possessive |
|---|---|
| 1SG | -niŋ |
| 2SG | -nɔm |
| 3SG | -ɖɔy |
| 1PL | -leŋ |
| 2PL | -beŋ |
| 3PL | -ɖɔy(-gi) |

==== Case ====
Gorum has two types of nominal marking to demonstrate clausal relation: objective/oblique/recipient marker e- and locative postposition etur. The conditions of variation in both cases and whether they carry any productive meaning or not remain unclear.

==== Gender ====
Gorum, like any other Munda languages, does not have a morphological concept of gender. Word pairs that show gender distinction are usually borrowed from Indo-Aryan and Dravidian. However, there is, at least, some kinds of word class distinction based on animacy exist, but the evidence is faint or frozen in Gorum.

==== Adjectives ====
It has not yet fully been determined whether adjectives exist as a separate lexical category in Gorum. If it does, then the adjective class of Gorum is definitely small, consisting of a few uninflectable words such as asaˀj "black", asel "white", lup "big", asuʔ "small". In attributive use, adjectives precede the nouns that they modify and nearly always attach the attributive suffix -nu. In predicative use, adjectives are expressed with the auxiliary ɖuku ("to be, to stay").

miŋ-nu rumaŋ azrali ɖuku
me-GEN cat cute be
'My cat is cute.'

There seems to be numerous roots —including adjectives — that may be used directly as semantic heads of predicates, typically to express inchoative semantics of the lexical concept. It is unknown which nominal or adjectival roots are capable of this verbal function.

aɖuˀd ɖigin lup-u-r-ay baˀj=gi=ni
boy all big-?-MID.PST-CLOC come=3PL=PROG
'The boys are growing up.'

==== Reflexive ====
Unlike other Munda languages, Gorum expresses reflexivity by marking the suffix -ne to the relevant noun phrases. For example,

miŋ miŋ-ne dorpoɳ-ba ne-giʔ-tu
I me-REFL mirror-LOC 1SG-see-MID.NPST
'I see myself in the mirror.'

==== Pronouns ====
| | Subject | | Object | |
| | singular | plural | singular | plural |
|---|---|---|---|---|
| 1st person | miŋ | bileŋ | eniŋ | enleŋ |
| 2nd person | maŋ | maiŋ | enɔm | enbeŋ |
| 3rd person | nɔˀd | nɔˀdgi | enɔˀd | enɔˀdgi |

==== Numerals ====
Being a severely endangered moribund language spoken by a scheduled tribe which is situated at the bottom of the socioeconomic hierarchical system of India, it is not surprising that Gorum's vocabulary has been massively impacted by recent loans from more dominant neighbouring languages Desia and Odia. Below are Gorum native numbers attested by Anderson and Rau during their 2008 linguistic expedition in Koraput:

Native Gorum counting from 1 to 7
| | Gorum | proto-Munda |
|---|---|---|
| 1 | bɔˀj | **mOOˀj |
| 2 | bag, bagu | *bar |
| 3 | yag, yagu, yagi | cf. PAA *peːˀ |
| 4 | ungi | cf. PAA *puənˀ |
| 5 | mɔnlɔy | cf. Proto-Pakanic *mi |
| 6 | turgi | *tur |
| 7 | gulgi | *gul |

Although numbers greater than 7 have been replaced by Indo-Aryan, Gorum originally may have a decimal counting system, indicated by older reports:

Native Gorum counting from 8 to 10
| | Sitapati (1933) | Zide (1978) | Aze (1973) | Bhattacharya (1954) | Mahapatra (1992) | Proto-Munda |
|---|---|---|---|---|---|---|
| 8 | tamgi | galgi | gul boˀj | | galga | *tam |
| 9 | timgi | algab, galgab | talgi | | galba | *tim |
| 10 | galgi | galgi, galgab, algab | | galgi | alga | *gv₄₈l (cf. proto-Palaungic *kɤːl) |

==== Derivation ====
In Gorum, there are several word derivation methods: affixation, reduplication, and compounding, etc. Monosyllabic stems can take prefixes such as pi-, bu-/bo-/ɔ-, u-, a- k/gV-, su-/sV-, infixes -n-, -ʔ-, suffixes -om, -li, partial or full reduplicate, and pair with verbs or nouns to form new words. There are verb-noun compounds, i.e. noun incorporation. Eg. zɔɖaʔ ('to (white) wash the walls'), composed of zɔd ('to wipe off') and ɖaʔ ('water'). Noun incorporation in Gorum is akin to the feature that also exists in Sora, Juray, Remo, Gutob, Kharia, Gtaʔ, and Kherwarian languages. Similar classificatory incorporation is found in Nicobarese and Khasic as well and may be an archaic feature of Austroasiatic morphosyntax.

=== Verbal morphology ===
==== Person indexation ====
| | Subject | | Object | |
| | singular | plural | singular | plural |
|---|---|---|---|---|
| 1st person | ne- | le- | -iŋ | -ileŋ |
| 2nd person | mɔ- | bɔ- | -ɔm | -ibeŋ |
| 3rd person | Ø- | -ey/=gi | -Ø | -Ø (-gi) |

Two third plural subject markers -ey and =gi may co-occur on the same predicate at the same time in some contexts without any clear motives.

baŋgiʔ-nu lɔk en ɔr-ɖa-ey=gi
lazy-ATTR folk this IPFV.NEG-do-3PL=3PL
'Lazy folks won't do this.'

Possessor of a logical argument in Sora-Gorum is marked by the object type.

miŋ pensil(-nom) ne-giʔ-t-ɔm
I pencil(-2.POSS) 1SG-see-ACT.NPST-2SG
'I see your pencil.'

==== Voice ====
The middle voice suffixes -n/-nuʔ can encode a wide array of generally intransitive functions including passive, middle passive, reflexivity, and indirect or self-benefactive middle.

eniŋ urazadz giʔ-n-iŋ luʔr-iŋ
I.OBJ plane see-MID-1SG AUX-1SG
'The plane is being seen by me.'

==== Version ====
Version ("affectedness") is a highly marked feature in Gorum verbal morphology and is distinctive from voice markers is that it does not occupy a slot in Gorum verb structure and nor an indication of relations between verbal actants marked in the verbal complex, but to encode their status of being affected in the discourse space. As mentioned above, Gorum version is represented by creaky voice vowels. It is used optionally to denote the notions of primary affectedness, discourse salience, and discourse deictic orientation.

1. (subject affecting)

miŋ ne-aɖaʔ-rṵ ne-k-rṵ
I 1SG.SUBJ-thirst-PST.AFF 1SG.SUBJ-AUX-MID.PST.AFF
'I was thirsty.'

2. (passive agent/indirect experiencer subject [object-as-subject])

miŋ aɖaʔ-r-iŋ
I thirst-MID.PST-1SG.OBJ
'I was thirsty.'

== Syntax ==
A native Gorum speaker shares how he and his family code-switch between Gorum, Desia and Odia

Gorum follows regional South Asian word order of SOV, but the positions of demonstratives, possessives, numerals in the NPs and verbal indexation show support for the evidence that a different word order was historically used predominantly in earlier Gorum syntax.

== Sample text ==
Gorum folklore: The Shrew that became a Tiger

biel bɔˀj luˀg ɖuku-rṵ
field one hole be-PST.AFF
'There was a hole in a field.'

luˀg mɔ-gulɔm-u
hole 2SG-know-MID.PST
'A hole, you know?'

luˀg aluŋ bɔˀj tsunʈia kuntur ɖuku-rṵ
hole inside one shrew rat be-PST.AFF
'Inside the hole there was a shrew'

dinek kuntur-ɖi kinte zum-u ɖaˀd taʔ-r-ay
one.day rat-FOC grass eat-INF for come.out-MID.PST-CLOC
'One day the shrew came out to eat some grass.'

taʔ nen bɔˀj kua kuntur-ɖi etur ɖuˀb-u ɖɔn-ru, lɔm-u ɖɔn-ru
come.out COND one crow rat-FOC LOC peck-ACT.PST AUX-ACT.PST bite-ACT.PST take-ACT.PST
'When it came out, a certain crow pecked the shrew, bit the shrew and took it away.'

ɖɔn-ru ɖu araʔ aliŋ ab-kɔ̰ko-ru
take-ACT.PST and tree inside CAUS-sit-MID.PST
'Having taken it, the crow sat in a tree'

zum-t-ay sun-ru ɖu milḛˀj kua-ɖi milḛˀj ɖu kua-ɖi besi milḛˀj ɖu kaakaa sun-ru amtɔm-ṵ taˀj tsunʈia kuntur-ɖi tɔˀb-ɖɔy baʔ ɔʔtur sṵŋ-ṵ lɔbɔʔ-n
eat-ACT.NPST-CLOC say-ACT.PST and happy.AFF crow-FOC happy.AFF and crow-FOC very happy.AFF and ‘Kaa-Kaa’ say-ACT.PST open.mouth-ACT.(PST).AFF AUX shrew rat-FOC mouth-3.POSS place from fall-MID.(PST).AFF ground-LOC
'“I must eat you” he said and the crow was very happy; he was happy and said “Kaa-Kaa” and as he opened his mouth, the shrew fell from his mouth to the ground.’'
