= EKL =

EKL may refer to

- East Kilbride railway station, in Scotland
- East Kowloon line, in Hong Kong
- Estonian Defence League (Estonian: Eesti Kaitseliit), a volunteer army
- Estonian Writers' Union (Estonian: Eesti Kirjanike Liit)
- Kol language (Bangladesh)
- League of Estonian Corporations (Estonian: Eesti Korporatsioonide Liit)
