= Kodaku people =

Indigenous people in India

Kodaku people are an indigenous people who live in India. They live in the hills and forests of Chhotanagpur, the bordering area of Chhattisgarh, Jharkhand and Uttar Pradesh. Their mother tongue, a Munda language, is also called Kodaku. Some Kodaku people speak Korwa as their mother tongue. They also speak Sadri, Chhattisgarhi, or Kurukh as a second language. The Kodaku people are mainly concentrated in the northeastern area of Surguja district in Chhattishgarh, southern parts of and Palamau, Gadhwa districts in Jharkhand and the southeastern region of Sonabhadra district of Uttar Pradesh. Kodaku people are now included in Scheduled Tribes by government of India. (along with Abij Maria and Korba community)

The name Kodaku originates from 'Kodwa' which means 'digger of the soil'.
