= Majhwar language =

Munda language of Uttar Pradesh, India

Majhwar
- Native to: India
- Region: Chhattisgarh, Uttar Pradesh, Sikkim
- Ethnicity: Majhwar
- Native speakers: (34,300 cited 1995)
- Language family: Austroasiatic: Munda; North; Kherwarian; Majhwar

Language codes
- ISO 639-3: mmj
- Glottolog: majh1236

Majhwar is a poorly-attested Munda language, apparently related to or a dialect of Asuri, spoken in northern Chhattisgarh and Sonbhadra district of Uttar Pradesh by the Majhwar tribe.

Today all Majhwars record their mother tongue as Indo-Aryan languages like Chhattisgarhi, Surgujia and Sadri.
