= Birhor people =

Tribal forest people, traditionally nomadic, found in Jharkhand

Birhor
Total population
- 17,045

Regions with significant populations
- India
- Jharkhand: 10,726
- Chhattisgarh: 3,105
- West Bengal: 2,241
- Odisha: 596
- Bihar: 377

Languages
- Hindi • Birhor

Religion
- Traditional beliefs • Hinduism • Pentecostalism

Related ethnic groups
- Munda • Hos • Kols • Bhumijs • Santhals

Birhor (or Birhul) are a tribal/Adivasi forest people, traditionally nomadic, living primarily in the Indian state of Jharkhand. They speak the Birhor language, which belongs to the Munda group of languages of the Austroasiatic language family.

== Etymology ==
Birhor means 'jungle people' - bir means 'jungle', hor means 'men'.

== Ethnology ==
The Birhors are of short stature, long head, wavy hair and broad nose. They claim descent from the Sun and believe that the Kharwars, who also trace their descent from the Sun, are their brothers. Ethnologically, they are akin to the Santals, Mundas, and Hos.

== Distribution ==
Birhors are found mainly in the area covered by the old Hazaribagh, Ranchi and Singhbhum districts before these were broken down into numerous smaller units, in Jharkhand. Some Birhors are also found in Orissa, Chhattisgarh and West Bengal. They are one of the smaller of the thirty scheduled tribes inhabiting Jharkhand.

== Population ==
Birhors number around 10,000. According to some sources, their numbers could be fewer than this.

== Language ==
Most speak Hindi, while some speak the critically endangered Birhor language, which belongs to the Munda group of languages of the Austroasiatic language family. Their language has similarities with Santali, Mundari and Ho languages. Birhors have a positive language attitude. They freely use the languages prevalent in the areas they move around and use Sadri, Santali, Ho, Mundari. Literacy rate in the first language was as low as 0.02 percent in 1971, but around 10 per cent were literate in Hindi.

== Socio-economic scenario ==
The “primitive subsistence economy” of the Birhors has been based on nomadic gathering and hunting, particularly for monkeys. They also trap rabbits and titirs (a small bird), and collect and sell honey. They make ropes out of the fibres of a particular species of vine, which they sell in the markets of the nearby agricultural people. Partly forced by circumstances, partly encouraged by government officials, some of them have settled into stable agriculture, but others continue their nomadic life, but even when they settle down in a village, their tendency is to lead a nomadic life. According to the socio-economic standing the Birhors are classified into two groups: the wandering Birhors are called Uthlus, and the settled ones are called Janghis. The Birhor are traditionally dependent on forest resources for their livelihood. They collect minor forest produce such as honey, fruits, and fibers, which play an important role in their subsistence economy.

== Traditional religious beliefs ==
The traditional magico-religious beliefs of Birhors are akin to those of the Hos. Mundari deities such as Sing Bonga (Sun God (Note: Although sing literally means 'sun' and bonga literally means 'spirit, deity,' the actual conceptualization of Sing Bonga is not as a 'sun god.' Sing Bonga is rather the creator of the universe, including humans, animals, plants, rocks, the Moon, and the Sun. Therefore, the word sing in Sing Bonga is sometimes interpreted as an adjective, like 'luminous' or 'brilliant'.)) and Hapram (ancestral spirits) rank high in esteem.

Hinduism and Pentecostal Christianity are making significant inroads into their society.

== Settlement ==
The temporary Birhor settlements are known as tandas or bands. These consist of at least half a dozen huts of conical shape, erected with leaves and branches. The household possessions traditionally consisted of earthen utensils, some digging implements, implements for hunting and trapping, rope making implements, baskets and so on. In recent times aluminium and steel have found their way into Birhor huts.

== Attempted integration ==
After Indian independence in 1947, the government has attempted to settle the Birhors by giving them land, bullocks for cultivation, agricultural implements and seeds. Schools for children, rope making centres and honey collection training centres were started. However, these efforts have borne little fruit as most of the Birhors have reverted to nomadic life.
