= Turi language =

Endangered Munda language of India

Turi
- तुरी
- Native to: India
- Region: Jharkhand
- Ethnicity: Turi
- Native speakers: 2,000 (2007)
- Language family: Austroasiatic: Munda; North; Kherwarian; Turi

Language codes
- ISO 639-3: trd
- Glottolog: turi1246
- ELP: Turi
- Turi is classified as Definitely Endangered by the UNESCO Atlas of the World's Languages in Danger

Turi is an endangered Austroasiatic language of India that belongs to the Kherwarian Munda group. Grierson (1906) described that Turi is similar to both Mundari and Santali. It is spoken by only half a percent of ethnic Turi, the rest having shifted to Sadri in Jharkhand, Mundari in West Bengal, and Odia in Odisha. The Turi are classified as a Scheduled Caste in Jharkhand.

== Distribution ==
Osada (1991) lists the following locations where Turi is spoken.

- Jharkhand (pop. 133,137 as of 1981; then part of Bihar)
  - Giridih district
  - Ranchi district
  - Hazaribagh district
- Chhattisgarh
  - Raigarh district
- West Bengal (pop. 26,443 as of 1981)
- Odisha (pop. 7,374 as of 1981)

== Classification ==
Turi has been traditionally grouped with the Mundaric dialect continuum. A recent phylogenetic analysis on Turi conducted by Peterson, et al. (2024) using the software COG from the Summer Institute of Linguistics found that Turi forms a closer cline with the Santali dialect continuum rather than with the Mundari-Ho dialects. This result is more aligned with the classification of Turi proposed by Ethnologue (Eberhard et al. (2023)). The analysis concludes that Turi may have separated from the Kherwarian languages groups from an early date so that it may constitute a third subgroup of Kherwarian.

== Phonology ==
=== Consonants ===
Similar to Santali and Mundari, but /w/ is replaced by /ʋ/ in Turi. Most Munda languages have voiced stops accompanied with pre-glottalization and nasal release, so does Turi, but the language tends to drop the stops entirely while retains the nasal and the glottal stop. Eg. Turi [uʔm] "hair", Mundari [uˀb̥ᵐ] "hair"; Turi [mɛʔn̪] "eye", Mundari [meˀd˺ⁿ] "eye".

		Bilabial	Dental	Alveolar	Postalveolar	Retroflex	Palatal	Velar	Glottal
Stop/Affricate	voiceless	p	t̪		t͡ʃ	ʈ	c	k	ʔ
Stop/Affricate	aspirated	pʰ	t̪ʰ		t͡ʃʰ	ʈʰ		kʰ	
Stop/Affricate	voiced	b	d̪		d͡ʒ	ɖ	ɟ	ɡ	
Stop/Affricate	breathy	bʱ	d̪ʱ		d͡ʒʱ	ɖʱ		ɡʱ	
Fricative				s					h
Nasal		m	n̪			ɳ	ɲ	ŋ	
Approximant		ʋ		l			j		
Flap				ɾ		ɽ			

=== Vowels ===
	Front	Central	Back
High	i		u
Mid-high		(ə)	
Mid-low	ɛ		ɔ
Low			ɑ

== Morphology ==
=== Nominals ===
==== Pronouns ====
Emphasis on dual and plural reference in Turi pronouns can be reinforced by attaching number markers =kin and =ku directly to the pronoun. Eg. ɑliŋ bɑɾɑŋ=kin "we both (EXCL)", ɑlɛ=ku "we (PL.EXCL)".

		singular	dual	plural
1st person	exclusive	iɲ	ɑliɲ	ɑlɛ
1st person	inclusive	iɲ	ɑlɑŋ	ɑpu
2nd person		ɑm	ɑbin	ɑpɛ
3rd person		uni	unkin	unku

==== Cases ====
Turi has five cases. The case markers follow the number markers. For example, tʃɑʋɑ=kun=rɛn (child=PL=GEN) "of the children".

Case	Marker	Function
Nominative	=Ø	Intransitive subject, transitive subject, inanimate and non-specific objects
Oblique	=kɛ	Primary objects with verbs of speech, animate secondary object
Genitive	=ɑ/=ɑʔ/=rɛn	Possession of pronouns (=ɑ/=ɑʔ) and else (=ren)
Instrumental	=tɛ	Medium
Locative	=ɾɛ	Location

=== Verbal morphology ===
==== Verbal agreement ====
Like all Kherwarian languages, Turi verbs index both the S/A and P arguments.

sɔbu kɑthɑ ɑjum=kɛtɛ bɑndrɑ=kun sɔbu ʈɔpi ɛm-tɑd=i=ɑ=ku
all story hear=SEQ monkey=PL all hat give-ACT.PST=3SG.OBJ.ANIM=FIN=3PL.SUBJ
'After hearing his whole story, the monkeys gave him all the hats.'

		singular	dual	plural
1st person	exclusive	=ɛŋ/=ɲ(iɲ)	=liɲ	=lɛ
1st person	inclusive	=ɛŋ/=ɲ(iɲ)	=lɑŋ	=pu
2nd person		=m	=bin	=pɛ
3rd person		=i (object)/ =ɛ (subject)	=kin	=ku

==== Tense, mood, aspect/aktionsart ====
Overview of Turi TAM markers
	Middle	Active
Present	-tɑn	-ɛtɑn
Future	-ɔʔ/-ɔ/-ʔ/-Ø	-Ø
Past	-ɛn/-kɛn/-ɔn/-ɔʔ-ɛn	-ɛkɛn – Past imperfective -tɑd – Simple past
Present perfect	-ɑkɑn	(-ɑkɑd)
Past perfect	-lɛn	-lɛʔ/-lɑʔ

==== Copulas ====
Odisha Turi has two copulas: the temporary/locative hɛn= (suppletive form kɑnɔʔɔ) and identity =nɑŋ. The origin of =nɑŋ is obscure.

Temporary locative copula sentence:

ɲɛl-lɑ=ə=ɛ dʒɛ miɑʔn ɑu ʈɔpi kɑnɔʔɔ
see-ACT.PST.PRF=FIN=3SG.ANIM then one and hat NEG.PRES.COP
'He saw then that there was (is) not one single hat.'

Identity copula sentence:

iɲ=ɑʔ ɲumu pɾʌbhɑt=nɑŋ
1SG=GEN name Prabhat=IDENT.COP
'My name is Prabhat.'
