= Turi (caste) =

Caste in India

Total population
- 198,344 (2011 census)

Regions with significant populations
- Jharkhand, Bihar, Chhattisgarh, Odisha, West Bengal

Languages
- Turi, Odia, Sadri, Laria, Bhojpuri, Hindi

Religion
- Hinduism

Related ethnic groups
- Kisan, Singh, Sharma, Kumar

The Turi is a caste found in the state of Jharkhand, Bihar, Odisha and West Bengal in India. They traditionally involved in the manufacture of household items of bamboo and farming.

== Etymology ==
The word Turi is derived from Tokri a basket made from bamboo.

== Origin ==
The Turi were traditionally involved in making household items from bamboo such as Tokri (basket), Sup (winnowing sieve), fan etc.

== Present circumstances ==
Turi are divided into many subgroups. They are further divided into various exogamous clans. Family of Turi are mostly patrilocal and patrilineal. They are employed in Cultivation, basketry and labour. They speak Odia, Laria, Hindi. Their festival are Kalipuja, Durgapuja, Nuakhai, Raja, Dola, Rathjatra, Makar. In modern period, the traditional business of basketry is in danger as there are lots of household items of plastic available in market. But traditional basket made of bamboo are in demand during festivals. According to the 2011 census, the population of Turi was 198,344.

== Official classification ==
In 1931, during British Period, they were listed as aboriginal tribe. In 1936, they were listed as Backward. In Patna division, Tirhut, Bengal, Hazaribagh and Manbhum, they were included in Scheduled Caste. After independence, they were included in the list of Scheduled Castes in Odisha, Jharkhand and West Bengal.
