= Korwa language =

Munda language spoken in India

Korwa
- Kodaku
- कोरवा
- Native to: India
- Ethnicity: Korwa (75%), Kodaku (25%)
- Native speakers: 28,453 (2011 census)
- Language family: Austroasiatic: Munda; North; Kherwarian; Mundaric; Korwa
- Writing system: Devanagari script

Language codes
- ISO 639-3: Either: ksz – Kodaku kfp – Korwa
- Glottolog: koda1256
- ELP: Korwa

Korwa, or Kodaku/Koraku (Koɽaku), is an Austroasiatic language spoken in the Indian states of Chhattisgarh and Jharkhand.

Existing Korwa linguistic documentation includes Bahl (1962), which is based on the Korwa dialect of Dumertoli village, Bagicha Block, Tehsil Jashpurnagar, Raigarh District, Chhattisgarh.

A 2022 study conducted by SIL International on Korwa-Koraku languages indicates that Korwa and Koraku are two different languages. According to Anderson et al. 2008, Koraku is more closer to Santali, while Korwa is closer to Mundari, two major subtypes of the Kherwarian languages, respectively.

== Varieties ==
Korwa is a dialect continuum. The two principal varieties are Korwa (Korowa) and Koraku (Koɖaku), spoken by the Korwa and Kodaku respectively. Out of the Korwa, only the Hill Korwa still speak the language, the others having shifted to regional languages. The Kodaku in Jharkhand call their language "Korwa". Both speak Sadri, Kurukh, or Chhattisgarhi as a second language, or in the case of Sadri sometimes as their first language.

Gregory Anderson (2008:195) lists the following locations for Korowa and Koraku.

- Korowa (Korwa) is spoken in northeastern Chhattisgarh state, including southern Surguja district, Jashpur district, parts of Raigarh district, and other neighboring areas. Korwa remains poorly documented, and the only documentation is in unpublished manuscripts.
- Koraku is spoken in southern Mirzapur district and Sonbhadra district of Uttar Pradesh, northern Surguja district of Chhattisgarh, and Palamau district and Garhwa district of Jharkhand. It remains undocumented except for some kinship terms given in Singh & Danda (1986).

According to Singh & Danda (1986:1), "a Kodaku is very clear about the differences between himself and the Korwa and a clear-cut distinction is made when a Korwa asks a Kodaku about his tribe, and vice versa."
