= Asur language =

Munda language spoken in India

Asuri
- असुर
- Native to: India
- Ethnicity: Asur
- Native speakers: 7,000 (2007)
- Language family: Austroasiatic: Munda; North; Kherwarian; Mundaric; Asuri

Language codes
- ISO 639-3: asr
- Glottolog: asur1254
- ELP: Asuri

Asuri is an Austroasiatic language spoken by the Asur people, part of the Munda branch. Asuri has many Dravidian loanwords due to contact with Kurukh.

== Sociolinguistic ==
The majority of Asuri speakers reside in the Gumla district of Chota Nagpur. In addition, there are smaller groups of Asuri speakers in Chhattisgarh, West Bengal, Odisha.

Ethnologue states that Birjia is a dialect of Asuri, but also that there is a related language Birjia; it is not clear if these refer to the same thing. However, Anderson (2008:195), based on Prasad (1961:314), suggests that Birjia (Binjhia) may be an Indo-Aryan language, although the Birjia are an ethnic subgroup of the Asuri tribe, along with the Asur proper and the Agariya.

Majhwar is unclassified, but based on location and other clues, it may turn out to be a dialect of Asuri. If so, its 35,000 speakers (reported in 1995, out of an ethnic group of 175,000) would make it the most populous form of Asuri.

Asuri is considered to be a "definitely endangered" language. One important reason for its distinction as endangered is due to a lack of any written form of the language. It exists only as a spoken language There are a total of 31 phonemes in Asuri, made up of twenty-six "segmental" and five "supra-segmental" phonemes. Of the former, there are twenty-one consonants and five vowels.

The Asur language is listed in UNESCO Interactive Atlas of the World's Languages in Danger. Using mobile radio, the Asur community, a Particularly Vulnerable Tribal Group(PVTG) in Jharkhand, has been spreading the popularity of the language within their geographical limits. News and entertainment programmes are broadcast on speakers at public places.

Chhotni, a native Asuri speaker, speaking Asuri language

== Geographical distribution ==
Ethnologue lists the following districts and states where Asuri is spoken.

- Jharkhand: southern Palamau district, northern Ranchi district, Gumla district, and Lohardaga district of the Chota Nagpur Plateau
- Chhattisgarh: Raigarh district and Jashpur district area
- Odisha: Sambalpur district
- West Bengal

== Phonology ==
Counting 1–10 in Asuri

=== Vowels ===
Asuri lacks phonemic nasalization, so a nasalised vowel cannot affect word meaning. Nasalizations are consistently used in words borrowed from Hindi and in onomatopoeic words like words for animal sounds. No acoustic studies have ever been done focusing on Asuri vowel length, durations, quality, frequencies, correlated features, and syllable prominence neither.

Monophthongs
	Front	Central	Back
Close	i		u
Mid	e		o
Open		a	

Diphthongs
	Fronting		Backing	
	Central	Back	Central	Back
Close	ai	ui oi	au	ou
Mid	ae		ao	

=== Consonants ===
		Bilabial	Denti- Alveolar	Retroflex	Palatal (-alveolar)	Velar	Glottal
Stop/Affricate	voiceless	p	t̪	ʈ	t͡ʃ	k	(ʔ)
Stop/Affricate	aspirated	pʰ	tʰ	ʈʰ	t͡ʃʰ	kʰ	
Stop/Affricate	voiced	b	d̪	ɖ	d͡ʒ	ɡ	
Stop/Affricate	breathy	bʱ	dʱ	ɖʱ	d͡ʒʱ	ɡʱ	
Fricative			s				h
Nasal		m	n			ŋ	
Approximant		w	l		j		
Trill			r				
Flap				ɽ			

== Morphology ==
=== Person indexation ===
Asuri belongs to the Mundaric type of Kherwarian languages which allows a transitive verb to encode maximum two pronominal clitic markers. The shorter forms of these person clitics only attach to the last open syllables.

		singular	dual	plural
1st person	exclusive	=iŋ/=ɲ	=aliŋ/=liŋ	=ale/=le
1st person	inclusive	=iŋ/=ɲ	=alaŋ/=laŋ	=abu/=bu
2nd person		=am/=m	=aben/=ben	=ape/=pe
3rd person		=ae/=e	=akin/=kin	=aku/=ku

=== Tense, mood, aspect/aktionsart ===
	Active	Middle
Future	-ku/-ko/-kw/-k/-ke	–
Present	-Ø	–
Present Progressive	-d	-tan
Simple Past	-l/-ked	-n/-nen
Perfect	-tad	–
Past perfect	–	-tahil/-tahin/-t̪ʰin
Habitual	-kin	
Irrealis	-ta/tahi-kw/ku/ko/k/ke	
Imperative	-e	

=== Voice-valency ===
	Marker
Passive	-o
Causative	-tʃi
Reciprocal	-opɽiŋo
Reflexive	-l-n
