= Bhumij language =

Endangered Austroasiatic language of India

Bhumij
- 𞗘𞗪𞗢𞗑𞗜𞗥𞗰 ভূমিজ • ଭୁମିଜ୍ • भूमिज
- The word "Bhumij" in Ol Onal script
- Native to: Jharkhand, Odisha, West Bengal, Assam India
- Ethnicity: Bhumij people
- Native speakers: 27,506 (2011 census)
- Language family: Austroasiatic: Munda; North Munda; Kherwarian; Bhumij
- Writing system: Ol Onal script Others: Devanagari script, Odia script, Bengali script

Official status
- Official language in: India: Jharkhand (additional)

Language codes
- ISO 639-3: (covered by unr Mundari)
- Glottolog: bhum1234 Bhumij
- ELP: Bhumij
- Distribution of Bhumij language in India

- Bhumij is classified as Vulnerable by the UNESCO Atlas of the World's Languages in Danger

Bhumij is a Kherwarian Munda language of the Austroasiatic language family primarily spoken by the Bhumij peoples in the Indian states Jharkhand, Odisha, West Bengal and Assam. As per the 2011 census, only 27,506 people out of 911,349 Bhumij people spoke Bhumij as their mother tongue, as most Bhumijas have shifted to one of the regional dominant languages. Thus the language is considered an extremely endangered language. Ol Onal, a script specifically to write Bhumij, was invented by Mahendra Nath Sardar.

== History ==
Bhumij speakers have traditionally lived throughout the Kherwarian area in the modern states of Jharkhand, Orissa and West Bengal. While spoken by very few Bhumij people today, it was much more widespread historically. Those who lived east in Dhalbhum mostly shifted to the Bengali language and lost their local tongue, while those who lived around the Chota Nagpur Plateau held on to their language. However, the number of Bhumij speakers has significantly declined since the early 20th century. This decline attributed to the classification of Bhumij as a dialect of Mundari language and the language replacement within the Bhumj society.

Bhumij was mainly an oral language until the development of the Ol Onal script by the Ol Guru Mahendra Nath Sardar between 1981 and 1992.

Bhumij is closely related to Ho, Mundari language and Santali and are often described as sister languages. Bhumij tribal people have protested for greater recognition and government funding for Bhumij-language education and public broadcasting resources.

== Geographic distribution ==
Historical speaker of Bhumij language
Census	Bhumij (±%)
1971	51,651
1981	50,384	(-2.5)
1991	45,302	(-10.1)
2001	47,443	(+4.7)
2011	27,506	(-42)
Note: In the 2011 census, for the first time, 34,651 respondents (primarily in Odisha) recorded Bhumijali as their mother tongue, likely as an alternative name for the Bhumij language or a dialect of Odia spoken by Bhumij tribe as many of this tribe speak Odia as their first language in Odisha. However, for census purposes, it was categorized under the Odia language, which resulted in a 42 percent decline in the number of Bhumij language speakers if they are actually Bhumij speakers.
Source: Census of India

Distribution of Bhumij language in the state of India
1. Jharkhand (41.0%)
2. West Bengal (25.5%)
3. Odisha (21.5%)
4. Bihar (3.50%)
5. Assam (3.50%)
6. Mizoram (2.00%)
7. Andaman and Nicobar islands (1.40%)
8. Tripura (1.10%)
9. Other (0.50%)

The highest concentrations of Bhumij language speakers are in East Singhbhum and Seraikela Kharsawan districts of Jharkhand, the Jangal mahals region of West Bengal (Jhargram, Bankura and Purulia districts) and Mayurbhanj district of Odisha.

== Official status ==
In October 2018, Bhumij was accorded the status of second language in the state of Jharkhand.

States like Odisha, West Bengal and Bihar have a large number of Bhumij people, yet the Bhumij language has not been given the status of a state language in these states so far.

== Writing system ==
Bhumij language has been written in Ol Onal script, invented between 1981 and 1992 by Mahendra Nath Sardar. The Bengali script, Odia script and Devanagari are also used to write the language.

== See also ==
- Languages of India
- Ol Onal script
- Bhumij
