= Birjia language =

Language spoken in India

Birjia
- Bijori
- Native to: India
- Ethnicity: Birjia
- Native speakers: (13,000 cited 2001)
- Language family: Austroasiatic: Munda; North; Kherwarian; Mundaric; Birjia

Language codes
- ISO 639-3: bix
- Glottolog: bijo1238

The Birjia language, also known as Binjhia or Bijori, is a language of India. It is commonly assumed to be a Munda language closely related to the Asuri language. However, Anderson, based on Prasad (1961:314), suggests that Birjia (Binjhia) may be an Indo-Aryan language, although the Birjia are a tribe of the Asuri nation. The latter include the Asur and the Agariya.

== Distribution ==
Birjia is spoken in:

- Jharkhand: Lohardaga district and Ranchi district
- West Bengal: Darjeeling district and Jalpaiguri district
- Madhya Pradesh
- Odisha

== Phonology ==
Bhattacharya (2022) lists the following phonemes for the Birjia variety spoken in Gumla district, Jharkhand:

=== Consonants ===
Birjia consonants
		Bilabial	Dental	Alveolar	Postalveolar	Retroflex	Palatal	Velar	Glottal
Stop/Affricate	voiceless	p	t̪		t͡ʃ	ʈ		k	ʔ
Stop/Affricate	aspirated	pʰ	t̪ʰ		t͡ʃʰ	ʈʰ		kʰ	
Stop/Affricate	voiced	b	d̪		d͡ʒ	ɖ		ɡ	
Stop/Affricate	breathy	bʱ	d̪ʱ		d͡ʒʱ	ɖʱ		ɡʱ	
Fricative		(f)		s			ç		h
Nasal		m		n			ɲ	ŋ	
Approximant		w		l			j		
Rhotic				r		ɽ			

=== Vowels ===
Birjia vowels
	Front	Central	Back
High	i		u
Mid-high	e	ə	o
Mid-low	ɛ		ɔ
Low		a	

=== Word structure ===
==== Monosyllabic templates ====
- VC: /otʰ/ "earth", /up/ "hair"
- V: /o/ "to smell"
- CV: /kʰu/ "cough"
- CVC: /ɟan/ "bone", /bʰap/ "steam"
- CVCC: /menʔ/ "eye"

==== Disyllabic templates ====
- VCV: /iʈa/ "brick"
- VVC: /oitʰ/ "behind"
- CVV: /rua/ "fever"
- CVCV: /hasa/ "clay"
- CVVC: /ɲein/ "toy"
- VCVC: /ipil/ "star"
- VCCVC: /uttər/ "north"
- CVCCV: /samdʱo/ "daughter-in-law's mother/
- CVCVC: /palah/ "snow"
- CVCCVC: /seŋgel/ "fire"
- CVCCCV: /banɖɽo/ "storm"
- CVCVCC: /reŋetʔ/ "hunger"
- CVCCVV: /sərləi/ "matchstick"
- CVVCVV: /kairao/ "to get angry"

==== Polysyllabic ====
- VCVCV: /iremi/ "to harvest"
- CVCVCV: /haremi/ "to bury a dead body"
- CVCVCVCV: /nakaɟami/ "to comb hair"
- CVCVCVCVCVC: /tajarajanam/ "to prepare"

== Morphology ==
=== Nominal morphology ===
==== Pronouns ====
	singular	dual	plural
1st person	ɲia		ɲia
2nd person	amaʔ	aban	ape
3rd person	huni/hunikuɽi	hukin	huku

==== Cases ====
Bhattacharya (2022) describes several cases in Birjia. Like Santali and Mundari, Birjia lacks general case markers to demonstrate syntactic relationship between arguments.

Case	Marker	Function
Nominative/Accusative	=Ø	Subjects and objects
Dative	=ʔta	Animate dative/recipient argument
Genitive	=raʔ	Possession
Instrumental	=te	Medium
Ablative	eteraʔ	From

== Vocabulary ==
=== Numerals ===
Numbers greater than three have been replaced by Indo-Aryan borrowings.

Gloss	Birjia	Santali
"one"	mian	mitˀ
"two"	barija	bar
"three"	peja	pɛ

=== Nature ===
Gloss	Birjia	Santali
"cloud"	rimil	rimil
"dog"	seta	seta
"he"	huni	uni
"horse"	sadom	sadɔm
"wood"	səhan	sahan
"fruit"	ɟoʔoh	dʒɔ
"fish"	haku	hako
"ant"	muon	muˀtʃ
"house"	oɽa	oɽaˀk
"star"	ipil	ipil
"rope"	bawer	baber ~ waber
