= Bonda language =

Munda language spoken in Odisha, India

Bonda
- Remosam
- ବଣ୍ଡା
- Conversation in Bonda about the Pusarke festival
- Native to: India
- Ethnicity: Bonda
- Native speakers: 9,000 (2002)
- Language family: Austroasiatic: Munda; South; Gutob-Remo; Bonda
- Dialects: Hill Remo; Plains Remo
- Writing system: Odia

Language codes
- ISO 639-3: bfw
- Glottolog: bond1245
- ELP: Remo

The Bonda language, also known as Bondo or Remosam, is a south Munda language of the Austroasiatic language family spoken in Odisha, formerly known as Southern Odisha, in India. It had 2,568 speakers, all in Odisha, according to the 1951 Census of India, increasing to approximately 9,000 speakers in 2002 according to SIL.

== Classification ==
The Bonda language is an indigenous language belonging to the Southern subgroup of the Munda branch of the Austroasiatic language family. Bonda is a spoken language with no traditional written system recorded. Bonda is a part of the Gutob-Remo branch, due to the similarities Bonda shares with another Southern Munda Language named Gutob.

== History ==
The Bonda language derives its name from the tribe of the Bonda people, an indigenous group located in Odisha known as the Bonda Highlanders. In their native language, the Bonda people regard themselves as "Remo", which translates to human, and derive their language name from that root, calling their language as the human language or "Remosam" in their native tongue

== Geographic distribution ==
The language differs slightly, classified according to whether it can be categorized as Plains Remo (Bonda) or Hill Remo (Bonda).

=== Plains Remo ===
This is a subdivision of Bonda, localized in 35 villages throughout the Khairpat within the Malkangiri district in Odisha. In 1941, 2,565 people categorized the Plains Remo. That number nearly doubled in 1971, with 4,764 people classifying themselves as Plains Remo. The increase in population was not correlated with language extension. There are 3,500 speakers as of 2002, but few are monolingual.

=== Hills Remo ===
This is a subdivision of Bonda, localized in the Jeypore Hills region of Odisha. There are 5,570 speakers as of 2002.

== Phonology ==
=== Stress ===
In Bonda, primary stress is placed on the last syllable in a word, syllables with diphthongs, glottal stops, or checked consonants. However, Plains Remo primarily stresses the second syllable in a word. Bonda words can have a maximum of 5 syllables.

=== Diphthongs ===
Diphthongs are placed either in the beginning or middle of a word, usually used in combination of two different vowel types.

Bonda	Translation
lean	tongue
bois	age
guidag	to wash
otoi	not to be
dau	small

=== Consonants ===
Hill Remo consonants
		Bilabial	Alveolar	Retroflex	(Alveolo-) Palatal	Velar	Glottal
Stop	voiceless	p	t	ʈ	(t͡ɕ)	k	ʔ
Stop	voiced	b	d	ɖ	d͡ʑ	ɡ	
Fricative	voiceless		s				
Fricative	voiced	(v)	z				
Nasal		m	N		ɲ	ŋ	
Approximant			L		j	w	
Rhotic			r	(ɽ)			

/ɽ/ is an allophone of /ɖ/ in intervocalic positions and behind /ʔ b g m/. Bhattacharya (1968) lists retroflex nasal /ɳ/ as a phoneme, however states that it occurs only in a few words loaned from Desia. He enumerates only one instance of it: /roɳa/ 'a man of the Raila community/caste', which is a Desia/Odia word. Similarly, the only ɳ-lexeme provided by Fernandez (1967) is /ɲoɳɖa/ 'honey'. Using Praat to analyze, however, Cheng (2012) does not found any medial retroflex nasal sound in that word but rather [ɲõːɖaʔ]. The retroflex nasal is also absent or may be not heard at all from any of the utterances.

Bhattacharya (1968) mentions that there is a "voiceless unaspirated palatal affricate" that occurs mostly in words of Indo-Aryan origin, which changes to /s/ in Remo. He uses <c> to denote this sound. Cheng's fieldworks between 2005-2011 encountered some examples of this phoneme. Instead of a fricative or a stop, the phoneme clearly has an affricate quality as it begins with a much shorter stop interval (0.0176 ms) and ends with a much shorter fricative interval (0.053 ms) compared to true stop (0.0714) and fricative (0.180). The spectral slice of the fricative release most closely resembles /ɕ/. Cheng concludes that Remo has a voiceless and voiced alveolo-palatal affricate pair of /t͡ɕ/ and /d͡ʑ/.

/z/ only occurs in loanwords from Odia. Retroflex /ɳ/ and fricative /v/ are found in Plain Remo, but not in the Hill Remo variety.

=== Vowels ===
Remo has 5 vowel phonemes: /a, e, i, o, u (ɔ)/ and a rare nasalized [ã].

	Front	Central	Back
Close	i		u
Mid	e	(ə)	o (ɔ)
Open		a	

In Plain Remo, depending on contexts, vowels can undergo laxing and weaking processes. For examples, /i/ > /ɪ/ in mirɪ ('why'), /e/ > /ɛ/ in kɛnda ('branch') and sɛllari ('scolopendra').

In Bonda, vowels are nasalized and clusters are commonplace.

== Grammar ==
=== Nominal postpositions ===
According to Fernandez (1968:97), Remo has 19 bound postpositional or case marking elements that will attach with nouns and pronouns. The most popular case marking postpositions are:

- Oblique a-
- Locative–Illative–Directional -boʔ
- Superessive -bagboʔ
- Subessive -aluŋ
- Adessive -borotere
- Perlative -nande
- Inessive -bitre

miɳɖa remo ŋkwusi-aluŋ ɖi-ta
one.HUM man jackfruit-SUBE COP-MID.NPST
'One man is beneath the jackfruit tree.'

There are instances of a- replacing the locative markers. Such examples, two sentences are equivalent:

niŋ korji-bagboʔ layk-t-iŋ
I chair-SUPE/LAT sit-MID.NPST=1
'I sit on the chair'

niŋ a-korji layk-t-iŋ
I OBL-chair sit-MID.NPST=1
'I sit on the chair'

=== Gender ===
Age and gender serve as classification denominations for individuals. Female names end in /-i/ and male names end in /-a/. Animals are also distinguished by gender.

=== Compound verb ===
The compound verb is not frequently used in Bonda and can be used as a conjunctive participle.

=== Verb agreement ===
Unlike Gutob, Remo subject enclitics always occupy the fixed position at the end of the verb. Third person marker =ga only occur in past tense, in other TAM categories the third person has no realization.

	singular	dual	plural
1st person	=iŋ	=naŋ	=naj
2nd person	=no	=pa	=pe
3rd person	=Ø, =ga		

nay sap-gə-tə=naj
We come-MID.PST-MID.NPST=1PL
'We all have come.'

mayeʔ wi-ga
They go-MID.PST.3
'They went.'

=== Tense-aspect-mood ===
Like most Munda languages, the basic tense system in Remo is divided into middle and active markers.

	Middle	Active
Nonpast	-to	-te/-ta
Simple Past	-gi/-ga/Ø	-ɔʔ
Perfect	-kV	
Subjunctive	-(l)ai	

=== Syntax ===
Bonda follows the SOV (Subject + Object + Verb) sequence, but other word orders are possible.

== Vocabulary ==
Gobardhan Panda showing body parts and pronouncing their respective names in Bonda

=== Kinship terminology ===
In Kinship terms, the velar nasal, ŋ, is often used. Various kinship terms also represent multiple positions.

Bonda	English Gloss
baʔ	Father
iyɔŋ	Mother
remɔ	Man
mpɔr	Husband
kunui	Wife
bɔrai	Aunt
busã	Uncle
tata	Grandfather
ya/iya	Father's Mother/Mother's Mother
maŋ	Eldest brother
miŋ	Elder sister
ileʔǐ	Grandchild
masɔ	Nephew

=== Basic vocabulary ===
The table below shows a vocabulary comparison of two dialects, Hill Remo and Plains Remo:

Hill Remo	Plains Remo	Gloss
gwiɖag	guiɖag	wash
igsam	iksam	shit, defecate
ɖwiɲ	ɖen	cook (v.)
turag	tuɖag	piss
kumal	kumab	bathe
lor	lor	vomit
dayks	dais	climb
munaʔwe	munaʔ	big
goswi	gosig	whistle
jinl	jin	win
pwoɖ	ɖel	jump (across)
suʔu	suʔug	blossom
wa	wal	swim
ɲzur	ɲjur	dawn
nsu	nsuk	knife
zuzu	dzudzu	sight
soma	maʔ	curry
jurgəta	ruŋɔ̃	chill
