= Gutob language =

Munda language spoken in India

Gutob
- Bodo Gadaba
- ଗଦବା
- Native to: India
- Region: Odisha, Andhra Pradesh
- Ethnicity: Gadaba people
- Native speakers: 10-15,000 (2008)
- Language family: Austroasiatic: Munda; South; Gutob-Remo; Gutob
- Writing system: Odia script

Language codes
- ISO 639-3: gbj
- Glottolog: bodo1267
- ELP: Gutob
- Gutob is classified as Vulnerable by the UNESCO Atlas of the World's Languages in Danger

The Gutob or Bodo Gadaba language is a south Munda language of the Austroasiatic language family of India, with the greatest concentrations of speakers being found in Koraput district of Odisha and Visakhapatnam district of Andhra Pradesh. It is also known simply as the Gadaba language, but it is different from the Dravidian Gadaba language. Other names for the Bodo Gadaba language include Gadba, Gutop, Gudwa, Godwa, Gadwa, and Boi Gadaba.

== Classification ==
The Gutob language belongs to the South Munda subgroup of the Munda branch of the Austroasiatic language family. It is most closely related to the Bondo language.

== Distribution ==
Gutob is spoken across southern Odisha and adjacent districts of northern Andhra Pradesh, and is concentrated primarily in Lamptaput block, Koraput district, southern Odisha. In recent centuries, Gutob speakers have also migrated to the plains of Andhra Pradesh as well as Rayagada District, including near the town Majiguda (close to Kalyansinghpur) where they live alongside the Dravidian-speaking Kondhs.

Ethnologue reports the following locations.

- 40 villages of Lamptaput block, Koraput district, southern Odisha
- Khoirput block, Malkangiri district, southern Odisha
- Visakhapatnam district, northern Andhra Pradesh

== Dialects ==
Although there are some speculation, Griffiths (2008) states "at least two dialects of Gutob exist": Koraput Gutob and Andhra Gutob. The author assumes that the former is the standard variety. The degree of mutual intelligibility of the two dialect is unknown, though differences in phonology and lexicons were reported by Subba Rao (1992) and Bhaskara Rao (1969), and the Andhra dialect has been strongly influenced by Telugu.

== Language status ==
The Gutob language is considered to be either endangered or moribund, due in part to several hydroelectric projects that have displaced Gutob people from their traditional villages and forced them to live as minorities in primarily Desiya-speaking villages. Anderson (2008) estimates the number of speakers at around 10 to 15,000, while the Asha Kiran society, which works in Koraput, estimates the number at less than 5,000. Virtually there are no Gutob monolinguals. The 2011 census most likely counts Gutob and Ollari as the same language, since they are both called Gadaba by outsiders. Although Gutob-language education has been attempted, it has faced stiff resistance and most parents still want their children to learn Desiya only due to being in mixed villages.

== Phonology ==
=== Consonant ===
Gutob consonants
		Bilabial	Alveolar	Retroflex	Postalv./ Palatal	Velar	Glottal
Plosive	voiceless	p	t	ʈ		k	ʔ
Plosive	voiced	b	d	ɖ		ɡ	
Fricative	voiceless		s				(h)
Fricative	voiced		z				
Affricate	voiceless		t͡s		t͡ʃ		
Affricate	voiced		d͡z		d͡ʒ		
Nasal		m	n		ɲ	ŋ	
Approximant			l		j		
Flap				(ɽ)			
Trill			r				

- /p/ can be fricativized in initial position to near that of [ɸ] and [f].
- In intervocalic position, labial phonemes may be realized as [b]; /ɖ/ as [ɽ], velars as [g] and optionally Ø.
- Intervocalic /ŋ/ is dropped in an utterance if the following phoneme is a vowel with concomitant nasalization.
- The status of /h/ is marginal, as it is limited to a few native and loan words.
- /n/ ~ [l] variants occur in some words.
- In two roots pig "break in half" and log "to fall", the voiced velar final alters to /ks/ before a front-vowel suffix. Eg. /piks-oʔ/ "broke in half", /ob-loks-oˀ/ "caused to fall".

=== Vowels ===
Gutob vowels
	Front	Central	Back
Close	i [i, ɪ]		u [u]
Mid	e [e, ɛ]		o [o, ɔ]
Open		a [a, ʌ, ɑ]	
Diphthong	/ai, ia, au, ao, oi, io, ou, ei, ie, eu/		

Initial /u/ cannot form diphthongs since it would be phonetically realized as a glide [w], thus it is more appropriate to recognize them as nonsyllabic approximants /w, j/.

=== Prosody ===
According to Voß, L-H word pattern is found across all Gutob words. Stress usually falls on the second syllable of Gutob disyllables and on the final syllable of other words. This pattern is already well-exhibited in the ethnonyms of the Gutob people: Dravidian-Desia [ˈgādabā] vs Gutob [guˈtɔb], Dravidianized Ollari [ˈtugoːlu] vs Gutob [tuˈgɔl] ('yesterday'). However, in trisyllabic verbal forms, the patterns may be unpredictable.

== Morphology ==
=== Nominal morphology ===
==== Number ====
Gutob distinguishes two numbers: singular (-Ø) and plural (-nen). The plural is not obligatorily marked.

==== Person ====
Kinship terms in Gutob are marked for inalienable possession by third possessives -ɖei/ɖoi.

==== Cases ====
Case marking in Gutob is not an overt component in the nominal morphology. According to Griffiths, there are three postpositions (suffixes) that always attach to pronouns and NPs to show cases: the unmarked subjective, the genitive/attributive/possessive -nu, and objective/oblique -pulai on nominals and pronouns, and o- on pronouns. In some cases, if the indirect object and the direct object in the same clause are both animate, the former will be marked.

==== Pronouns ====
	singular	plural
1st person	niŋ	nei/naj
2nd person	nom	pen
3rd person	maj	majnen

==== Interrogatives ====
Gutob employs a series of interrogative forms that can function as relative pronouns. Maŋ ("what") can sometimes be used as both a substantive and an adjective.

	Interrogatives
maŋ	'what?'
maŋɖem	'why?'
monoʔ	'where?'
umboʔ	'in what direction?'
umboʔɖiʔke	'from where, from what direction?'
unɖoi	'when, which day?'
ar-unɖoi	'not any day soon?'
eran, aren, emran	'how?'
laj	'who?'
-ki	Question marker

==== Demonstratives ====
Gutob has a three-way demonstrative system.

	Proximate	Intermediate	Remote
main bases	e-	u-	tu-
derived	eke		otu/utu
expressive			ha/hu

==== Adpositions ====
Gutob adpositions
	Meaning
ali	'near'
aluŋ	'inside'
ɖiʔke	'from'
boʔ	'in, at, to'
buɖon/boɖon	'with'
kuruŋ	'toward, at'
lagire	'due to'
munaŋ	'like, by the way of'
oʔɖon/orbon	'near'
pulai	'in order to, for'
sumoŋ	'in front of'
tobnaŋ	'above'

==== Numerals and classifiers ====
Gutob used to have a decimal counting system. Nowadays most of it has been supplemented by numerals borrowed from Desia, Oriya, and Telugu. Counting numbers larger than 20 adopts a vigesimal strategy from Indo-Aryan.

Native Gutob numerals
	Ramamurti (1938)	Izikowitz (1951)	Subba Rao (1992)
1	muiroʔ	muiro	muːỹu
2	umbar, mar, ummar	mbar	mbaːru
3	igen, iʔgen, iʔgen-roʔ	ʔigen	iggeːnu
4	uʔun (uʔn)	–	uːnu, puːnja
5	mallai	–	moley
6	tir	–	–
7	gil	–	–
8	tam-gi	–	–
9	tim-gi	–	–
10	gol	–	–
11	gol-mui	–	–
12	gol-mbar	–	–

Gutob has a small set of classifiers. The majority of them were borrowed from Desia.

	Classifier	Source
-ɖan	humans	Gutob
lok	humans	Desia
rasi	young people	Desia
munɖ	cattles	Desia

==== Adjectives ====
Adjectives do not exist as a separate part of speech in Gutob. Lexical roots can serve as the head of the attributive function via appropriate predicative inflection and are then placed before the element that needs to be modified.

ar-batʃej=gu=nu rukuʔ
NEG-polish=MID.PST=ATTR rice
'unpolished rice'

dorkar uraʔ=gu=nu
need NEG.COP=MID.PST=ATTR
'waste, useless'

==== Derivation ====
Gutob employs the nominalizing suffix -kaŋ to derive nominals from nominals and other parts of speech.

buron-kaŋ riŋ=to=pen ki usor-kaŋ?
live-NMLZ bring=HAB=2PL or be.dry-NMLZ
'Do you bring green or dry (wood)?'

pen=nu panɖoj time-kaŋ
2PL=GEN shoes new-NMLZ
'Your(Pl) shoes are new.'

There are several other (compositional and idiosyncratic) nominalizing derivation methods involving infixes and prefixes, though none of them appear to be productive at the current stage.

- Nominalizing infix -n- or prefix an- are commonly found in derived nouns. Eg. ab "to husk" → an-ab "husk" (n.); baj "to decorate" → b-un-aj "writing, arithmetic, embroidery"; peɖ "to blow" → p-in-eɖ "flute"; sar "to comb" → s-un-ar "comb" (n.); siɖ "to bird-lime" → s-in-iɖ "bird-lime, gum"; zuŋ "to suspend" → z-un-uŋ "clothesline".
- An animal marking prefix gV- usually occurs in conjunction with faunal nomenclature. Although the unprefix roots can appear in various semantically linked compounds, they never manifest as free-standing forms. Eg. gibir "pig"; gikil "tiger"; giliʔ "rabbit"; gimeʔ "goat", gisi "lice", gisiŋ 'chicken', gubon "bear"; gugaʔ "crow"; guladʒ "bull, ox"; gusaʔ "monkey", gusoʔ "dog".
- An unknown prefix sV- This prefix is often found in some lexical words with unclear meaning and function. Eg. silen (only in silen-daʔ "sweat"); simon "day time, day"; sukug "gourd"; sulob "tree"; siledʒ "long"; sisang "bone"; suŋmol "seed/pit"; suram "antelope"; sumoŋ "in front of"; silim ?; subul "sweet"; suloŋ "far away"; sulodz "stomach"; susuŋ "leg".

=== Predicative morphology ===
Gutob lacks strong distinction between lexical categories, as roots may exhibit categorical underspecification. For example, a Gutob word that was derived from the Odia noun mahajana ("important man") can be expressed as the head of a predicate with compositional semantic result:

mazon=gu=nom
important.man=MID.PST=2
'You became an important man.'

A general characteristic of the Munda languages is weak lexical distinction, noted by Pinnow (1966). Lexical function mainly depends on syntactic configuration, allowing any lexeme to be used for either the predicative role and its complements free of will, although observations stated that this phenomenon is not as robust in South Munda as in North Munda.

==== Pronominal markers ====
Like Kherwarian languages (such as Santali), Kharia, and Remo, person indexation (subject) in Gutob verb (TAM/person-syntagma) is achieved solely through enclitics. The first and second person clitics are basically the same as pronouns.

	singular	plural
1st person	=niŋ	=nei/=naj
2nd person	=nom	=pen
3rd person	=Ø	=nen

The placement of subject enclitics in Gutob predicates is extremely variable, unlike fixed positions in Kharia, Remo, and Kherwarian. They can unpredictively attach to any preverbal elements, including locatives, temporals, adverbials, object NPs, interrogatives, adjectives, and demonstratives, displaying no clear preference for a host. It seems that the subject markers in Gutob are not explicitly parts of the verbal system. A study by Just & Voß (2023) found that subject enclitics are highly sensitive to discourse; they are often placed wherever the topic is the most prominent. These atypical characteristics sets Gutob person indexation system apart from the normal clines of Munda indexation.

In complex predicates with the presence of an auxiliary verb, the person markers are repeated not only for the lexical verb but also for the auxiliary. However the AVC double marking pattern in Gutob may have considerable variation regarding the placement of the subject enclitics due to pragmatic discourse-oriented factors.

sobu paiʈi niŋ ɖem=oʔ=niŋ beɽbeʔ=niŋ
all work I do=ACT.PST=1SG AUX=1SG
'I did all the work.'

loʈei=oʔ=niŋ beɽ=oʔ=su
have.sex.with.woman=ACT.PST=1 AUX=ACT.PST=SS
'After I had sex with her.'

==== Tense-mood-aspect-aktionsart ====
	Affirmative		Negative	
	Active	Middle	Active	Middle
Imperfective	=tu	=loŋ	=Ø	=a
Past	=oʔ	=gV	=to	
Imperative	=Ø	=a	=oʔ	=gV
Habitual	=to		–	
Optative	=e		=e	

The auxiliary verb ɖuk presents an irregular paradigm in non-negated formation. This auxiliary behaves like the English copula verb "to be". It is often used to cover aspectual, negative, attributive, and possessive constructions, as well as cases where a lexeme is not used directly as the head of a predicate. For instance:

bezri aɽo boʔ ui=gi=pen ɖu=gu
tomato garden LOC go=MID.PST=2PL AUX=MID.PST
'You [be]went to the tomato garden.'

joŋkuj gibig-laj butoŋ ɖu=gu
woman pig=OBL fear AUX=MID.PST
'The woman was scared of the pig.'

TAM paradigm of ɖuk
	Form	meaning
Present	ɖu-tu	'is'
Future	ɖu-loŋ	'will be'
Past	ɖu-gu	'was'
Imperative	ɖuk-a	'be!'
Habitual	ɖu-to	'is (usually)'
Optative	ɖik-e	'may be'
Infinitive	ɖu-Ø	'(to) be'

Borrowed marker =ni is used to encode the progressive:

gusoʔ gusoʔ-nen=oʔ tʃaba-ruma ɖeŋ=gu=nen=ni
dog dog-PL=EMPH bite-ECHO AUX=MID.PST=PL=PROG
'Dogs are biting each other.'

==== Incorporation ====
Gutob, like Remo, has fossilized and unproductive lexical noun incorporation with the head predicative lexical base always placed in the initial position, then followed by nominals (mostly body parts).

iŋmoʔ
shut.eye
'eye-closing'

==== Negation ====
Negation is the most complex aspect of Gutob morphosyntax, a feature also shared by its relative languages, Gorum and Juang. The following is a brief outline of the Gutob negative system.

- In the negative paradigm, TAM morphemes often function in ways opposite to their values in the affirmative paradigm, despite being formally identical. This asymmetry in Gutob negation creates an opaque system in which many negative forms do not map compositionally to their positive equivalents, contributing to late acquisition in children and difficulty for second-language learners.
- There are two main negative prefixes ar- ("not") for finite predicates, and mor- ("not yet") for subordinating clauses, and it seems that mor- has a fuller thematic load than the former.
- Two additional negative copulae uraʔ ("not") and oroj ("not yet") play substitutive roles in aspectual and habitual negative constructions. Uraʔ can take TAM, person index, and behave like a predicate, eg. uraʔ-gu ("was not").
- The negative active nonpast form is ar-X=Ø, and the negative middle nonpast is ar-X=a. In affirmative constructions, these markers would express the imperative mood. The negative past form is ar-X=to regardless of whether it is in the active or the middle, monovalent or polyvalent predicate.
- The prohibitive negation in active voice form is ar-X=oʔ, while the middle form is ar-X=gi/gu. It would be equivalent to the English prohibitive sentence “Do not X!”
- The negative optative form is ar-X=e, functionally and semantically the same as the affirmative optative, and corresponds to constructions like "may not X".
- For the negative habitual, the predicate structure employs a negative copulae in the postverbal position. Eg. gonɖaʔ=nen uraʔ (urinate=PL NEG.COP "(they) do not urinate…").
- The negative infinitival present form involves masdar and the auxiliary copula. Eg. se-ser uraʔ (RDPL-sing NEG.COP "doesn’t sing"). This formation can also be interpreted as a negative perfective if the negative copula oroj is used instead. Eg. tu-tur oroj (RDPL-come NEG.COP "not come yet").
- The negative present progressive requires the masdar of the lexical head and an inflected form of the auxiliary verb ɖuk. Its structure is RDPL-X ar-ɖu=oʔ/gi/gu. Eg. se-ser ar-ɖu-gu (RDPL-sing NEG-be=NEG.NPST "don’t be singing"). The same structural pattern applies to the negative past perfect, but unusually, it combines with the affirmative habitual, thus its structure is RDPL-X ar-ɖu=to. Several aspectual negative formations, including the past progressive and future progressive, use the negative copulas instead of the negative prefixes.

==== Complex predicates ====
Gutob has developed a rich system of auxiliary verb (v2) construction predication. There are two types of AVCs:

- General converb + auxiliary

- The general converb structure consists of a lexical head that carries main semantics, and may have a converb suffix -na to mark infinitive.
- an auxiliary verb complements or enriches grammatical information to the semantic base, such as motion, aktionsart, mode, etc. The auxiliary head is obliged to mark inflectional categories for the predicate, while the lexical head may or may not. Some of the auxiliary verbs are listed in the table below:

Verb	Gloss	Functions as auxiliary
suŋ	'throw'	sudden actions, completive
riŋ	'take, bring'	autobenefactive
ui	'go'	translocative, completive
piŋ	'come'	cislocative
beɖ	'give'	benefactive, completive
sarei	'finish'	telicity
lagei	'apply'	inception

burol=ɖu=gu=na kunig-uɖam godz-gi ui-gi=nen
live=AUX=MID.PST=CONV old.man-old.woman die=MID.PST AUX=MID.PST=3PL
'they (the three of them) lived (like that) and (then) the old man and woman [had] died.'

zar ɖu=gu=nu boŋtel zetki panzia sobu sob=oʔ ui=to
whose be=MID.PST=ATTR buffalo how.many Panzias all carry=ACT.PST AUX=HAB
'The Panzias take away all buffaloes, however many [they may be], and to whomever they might have belonged.'

- Infinitive ("to X") + goŋ/ɖem. Goŋ functions like the English auxiliary "can" while ɖem literally means "to become".

zu~zu niŋ goŋ-uraʔ
RDPL~see I can-NEG.COP
'I can't see'

== Syntax ==
=== Simple sentence structure ===
Argument marking in Gutob is typical of dependent-marking, nominative-accusative languages. The accusative head argument of the simple clause is overtly marked.

hãã, tu lok-laj zu=oʔ=niŋ
Yes, that person-OBL see=ACT.PST=1SG
'Yes, I saw the man.'

niŋ o-maj-toŋ-nen ob-gir=oʔ=niŋ=su majnen gir=gu=nen
I OBL-3-those-PL CAUS-learn=ACT.PST=1SG=CONJ they learn=MID.PST=3PL
'I taught them and they learned.'

The general word order in Gutob is SOV. However, topic can flip to the first position of the clause, which leads to OSV order due to certain conditions of focus, emphasis, etc:

Sabita Sonja-nu-pulai mui-ro bodʒ riŋ=oʔ
Sabita Sonya-ATTR-OBL one-CLF book bring=ACT.PST
'Sabita brought a book to Sonya.'

sobu paiʈi niŋ ɖem=oʔ=niŋ beɽbeʔ=niŋ
all work I do=ACT.PST=1SG AUX=1SG
'I did all the work.'

Gutob NP is head-final with all modifiers and demonstratives put before the syntactic head. The simplified NP has the following structure:

[(DEMONSTRATIVE)/(QUANTIFIER)] (ADJECTIVE) (ADJECTIVE) LEXEME

There is evidence pertaining to a different NP structure in an earlier stage of this language.

=== Complex sentence structure ===
Particles mĩõʔ ("again"), ɖoŋ ("and"), and the suffixing element -sa ("and") are used as coordinatives in clausal structures.

zona aɖo-sa nei-nu oʔ, lioŋ-sa nei-nu oʔ, lamgo-sa nei-nu oʔ
corn orchard-and 1PL-GEN EMPH wet.rice.field-and 1PL-GEN EMPH dry.field-and 1PL-GEN EMPH
'The corn orchard is ours, and the wet field is ours, and the dry field is ours.'

memor mĩõʔ niŋ mĩõʔ sonia aɖsali boʔ log=gu=nei beɖ=oʔ
ward.member again I again Sonia Adsali LOC fall=MID.PST=PL AUX=ACT.PST
'The ward member, I and Sonia fell down to Adsali.'

Disjunctive formation is expressed by the word ki "or".

oʔɖon kinɖaʔ ki suloŋ?
close river or far?
'[Is] the river close or far?'

Complement clauses are indicated by a quotative word ɖieʔ (derived from ɖi "to speak") or its variant extensions ɖ(i)eʔna or ɖieʔsu. Verbs of speech are frequently repeated around the complement clause to denote a quoting action.

saukar zu=oʔ=su umboʔ=nom ui Barogaʈia ɖieʔ salag=oʔ
merchant see=ACT.PST=CONJ whither=2SG go Barogatia QUOT ask=ACT.PST
The merchant saw him and asked, "Where are you going, Barogatia?"

aʔ=pen monoʔ=pen pi=loŋ ɖieʔ ɖieʔ ɖiʔto
now=2PL where=2PL come=MID.FUT QUOT QUOT QUOT
'[Someone, i.e., friend, asks] Where will you go now?'

Relative linkage comprises two types: the native Gutob use of the GEN/ATTR marker, or by employing borrowed pronouns or native calques:

nei purbe dine ɖiʔke ɖen-ɖem-nu lioŋ
We old day from RDPL~do-GEN wet.field
'It is a wet field which we work on from of old.'

laj mara mari ɖeŋ=gu=nen o-maj razi ɖem=to
who beat ECHO become=MID.PST=PL OBL-3SG agree make=HAB
'He makes those who have fought with each other settle their dispute.'

Anderson & Boyle (2002) state that Gutob -su and -na are switch-reference markers, which -su marks for the same subject, and -na denotes a different subject. Although there is a tendency for the two markers to occur with switch reference, Griffiths (2008) notes that both forms also frequently occur in subordinative clauses without serving the function of tracking reference between clauses. He therefore readjusts the interpretation of -su and -na as conjunctive and conditional converb markers for subordinative clauses, respectively.

Example of -su without same subject:

niŋ piŋ=gi=niŋ=su o-niŋ sa-pa beɖ=oʔ=su ob-lei=oʔ=nen
I come=MID.PST=1SG=CONJ OBJ-me tea-ECHO give=ACT.PST=CONJ CAUS-sit=ACT.PST=PL
’After I had come, they gave me tea etc. and made me sit.'

Example of -na without different subject:

ɖien boʔ ledʒ=gi ɖu=gu=na mĩõʔ ladʒ zu=tu=nen?
house LOC sit.down=MID.PST AUX=MID.PST=CONV again who see=ACT.NPST=PL
'If they keep sitting at home, whom else will they see?'

== Semantics and discourse ==
In Gutob, there is a basic set of three color terms that are commonly used are Desia loan words: dob 'white' (Gutob pileʔ), roŋ 'red' (Gutob equivalent unknown), kala 'black' (Gutob iɖel).

Narrative and discourse frequently employ words like ɖiʔto, oʔ, laka, aka, be, and ta. The word ɖiʔto, presumably derived from "it is said," although its precise function is relatively unclear, is commonly used to mark a quotation in Gutob narrative. Consider the following example:

oɲzirel iɖaʔ ɖiʔto iɖ=oʔ, lai som=oʔ maʔ som=oʔ, kond boʔ ʈeŋgia ɖiʔto ɖon=oʔ, mĩõʔ tur=gu ui=gi ɖiʔto tu maj=nu mala boʔ
morning.time gruel QUOT drink=ACT.PST cooked.rice eat=ACT.PST curry eat=ACT.PST shoulder LOC axe QUOT carry=ACT.PST again leave=MID.PST AUX=MID.PST QUOT that he=GEN patch.of.wood LOC
'[It is said] In the morning, he drank gruel, he ate rice, he ate curry, he carried his axe on his shoulder, and took off again, to that patch of wood of his.'

The particle oʔ functions as the general emphasis; laka as the measurement emphasis; aka as the emphasis for the preceding word. Particle be is used to mark in polite discourse (analyzed by Voß (2015) as a verbal clitic). The discourse particle ta is sometimes also used to highlight discourse focus as well.

== Vocabulary ==
The Gutob lexicon is characterized by extensive borrowing from neighboring socially prestigious Indo-Aryan Desia. Through Desia, Gutob has incorporated a vast corpus of Indo-Aryan loanwords, and speakers often prefer using Indo-Aryan words over the Austroasiatic ones. Within the Koraput region, bilingualism is now ubiquitous among tribals, under which Gutob is no longer considered the first language of the tribe. Observations from the 1960s show that inside the speech community, code-switching between Gutob and Desia was already extremely common, illustrated by the following sentences recorded from a Gutob conversation (The emboldened words are Desia):

noro-r murti nai, dek-ba-ke sundor naĩ, kai-ba-ke mundur naĩ, ɖeŋ=gu ui ɖem=to, pen ui=gi ɖeʔna ɖien-nu paiʈi kimbodʒ remol pulai-sina zana.
man-GEN shape NEG watch-INF-OBL beautiful NEG eat-INF-OBL sweet NEG become=MID.PST AUX:go AUX:become=HAB 2PL go=MID.PST QUOT house-GEN work wife husband to-only known
'There’s not the shape of a man, it’s not beautiful to watch, there's nothing sweet to eat. If you go, only the man and wife know the household work.'

Norman Zide (1985) commented on Gutob:

Gutob (like Kharia and Gorum) has borrowed a great deal of vocabulary – including a great percentage of its verb stock – from IA (which, for Gorum and Gutob, means Desia). Of these borrowings, the great majority (but not adjectives or statives) takes the suffixes -ei and -a. At least thirty percent (of a not particularly conservative dialect) of the verb lexicon consisted of ei/a-taking verbs.

== Sample text ==
The following text was from a story narrated by a Gutob man, recorded in 2016 in Jalahanzar, Koraput district, Odisha. Link to the video is provided in the #External links section.

kolia=nu samo sun=tu=niŋ
jackal=GEN story say=ACT.FUT=1SG
I will tell the story of the jackal.

kunig uɳɖam ɖu=gu=nen ɖiʔto
old.woman old.man be=PST=PL QUOT
There was an old couple.

ɖu=gu=nen=ze
be=PST=PL=CNTR
They lived.

semti buron aʔso buron aʔso ɖu=gu=nen ɖiʔto
like.this live dwell live dwell be=PST=PL QUOT
Like that they kept living and welling.

mui-roʔ din ɖiʔto e kunig biroŋ boʔ usoŋ ui=a=naj.
one-CLF day QUOT hey old.woman, hill.forest LOC today go=MID.IMP=1PL
One day [the man said], "Hey old woman, let's go to the forest today."

uɳɖoj uraʔ uɳɖam
today NEG old.man
"Never, old man!"

usoŋ kemti biroŋ boʔ ui=a=naj ɖioʔ sun=oʔ=nom
today how hill.forest LOC go=MID.IMP=1PL QUOT say=ACT.PST=2SG
"How often did you say 'let's go to the forest today?"

uraʔ ui=a=naj kina ɖiʔ=oʔ=ni
NEG go=MID.IMP=1PL or.not say=ACT.PST=PROG
He keeps saying "No, please let's go."

ui=a=naj ɖi=oʔ=na ale iɖaʔ ɖem
go=MID.IMP=1PL say=ACT.PST=CONV VOC gruel make
"If you say "let's go", well make gruel."

usoŋ ui=a=naj, al=gu=sa naj ulo
today go=MID.IMP=1PL wander=MID.PST=CONJ we come.here.IMP
"Let's go today. Let's come on foot."

ɖioʔ=su biroŋ boʔ moɽ=gu ui=gu=nen, kunig uɳɖam
QUOT=SEQ hill.forest LOC get.up=MID.PST go=MID.PST=PL old.woman old.man
They said and left for the forest, the old couple.

al-al al-al al=gu=nen
wander-RDPL wander-RDPL wander=MID.PST=PL
They kept walking and walking and walking.

al=gu=na olaʔ ɖiʔto dzoɽek milei=gu
wander=MID.PST=CONV leaf QUOT pair find=MID.PST
When they walked, they found two leaves.

olaʔ milei=gu=su e kunig, olaʔ dzoɽek moj=naj kina
leaf find=MID.PST=SEQ hey old.woman leaf pair pluck=1PL or.not
They found the leaves and [the man said] "Hey old woman, let's pluck two leaves."

pita=sa si-sir ɖem=loŋ ɖiʔ=oʔ=nen
pita.tuber=CONJ roast-RDPL AUX=MID.NPST say=ACT.PST=PL
"We can also roast the pita." they said.

pita sir=oʔ=na luʈub uraʔ=ze
pita roast=ACT.PST=CONV flour NEG=CNTR
"But if we make pita, there won't be flour left."

luʈub mĩõʔ laj=nu boʔ=sa luɖ=naj raɳɖe
flour again someone=ATTR LOC=CONJ beg=1PL ?
"We can just ask for flour at someone's [house]."

usoŋ=to siaɽi olaʔ milei=gu ɖu=tu
today=FOC Siari.vine leaf find=MID.PST AUX=NPST
"Today we have found Siaɽi leaves."
