= Birhor language =

Endangered Austroasiatic language of India

Birhor
- बिरहोर
- Native to: India
- Ethnicity: 17,044 Birhor people
- Native speakers: 2,000 (2007)
- Language family: Austroasiatic: Munda; North; Kherwarian; Mundaric; Birhor

Language codes
- ISO 639-3: biy
- Glottolog: birh1242
- ELP: Birhor
- Birhor is classified as Critically Endangered by the UNESCO Atlas of the World's Languages in Danger

The Birhor language is a highly endangered Munda language spoken by the Birhor people in Chhattisgarh, Odisha, West Bengal, and Maharashtra states in India.

The Birhor are found mostly in Chota Nagpur Plateau and Santhal Paragana, with the Uthlu Birhors living near Bishunpur, Gumla district, Jharkhand (along the western border with Chhattisgarh).

== Status ==
Birhor speakers are shifting towards Hindi, and a small minority know Ho. There are few available educational resources available in Birhor. According to Living Tongues Institute for Endangered Languages, "The Birhor are a Munda-speaking, forest-dependent semi-nomadic tribal community with fewer than 20,000 members [...] Only a few thousand fluent speakers of the Birhor language remain at present as their way of life and their language are both under threat. Until recently, many Birhor subsisted as hunter-gatherers living in leaf-huts setting up camps at the edge of village market areas, selling rope and rope products in local village markets; many now have been forced to live in settled agricultural communities, as forest degradation and urban encroachment has made hunting and gathering no longer viable as a way of life. Officially a ‘primitive’ tribal group, the Birhor stand at the very bottom of the complex and multi-tiered ethno-religious and linguistic hierarchies that dominate Indian life. In northern Odisha, two different groups are officially known as ‘monkey-eaters’ and overtly despised. The cultural and environmental context that the Birhor people are living in is changing rapidly and their language and culture are both poorly documented. Both will likely soon disappear without immediate action."
