= Kol language (Bangladesh) =

Munda language of Bangladesh

Kol
- Hor
- হর
- Native to: Bangladesh
- Native speakers: 1,660 (2012)
- Language family: Austroasiatic: Munda; North; Kherwarian; Santalic; Kol

Language codes
- ISO 639-3: ekl
- Glottolog: kolb1241

Kol is a Munda language spoken by a minority in Bangladesh. Kim (2010) considers Kol and Koda to be Mundari cluster languages. Kol villages include Babudaing in Rajshahi Division and Rangpur Division, Bangladesh, while Koda-speaking villages include Kundang and Krishnupur.
