= Agariya language =

Austroasiatic language of India

Agariya
- (unattested)
- Native to: India
- Region: Chhattisgarh, Odisha, Madhya Pradesh
- Ethnicity: Agariya
- Native speakers: 72,000 (2007)
- Language family: Indo-European: Indo-Iranian; Indo Aryan; Eastern; Odia; Agariya
- Writing system: Devanagari and Odia

Language codes
- ISO 639-3: agi
- Glottolog: agar1251

Agariya is a spurious language said to be spoken by the Agariya people, a community found in northern Chhattisgarh, western Odisha and eastern Madhya Pradesh. Although recorded in Ethnologue with an ISO code, the language is declared as being of the Dravidian languages and as unattested by Glottolog and its existence was explicitly denied by noted scholar of tribal traditions Verrier Elwin, and more recently by linguist Felix Rau and Paul Sidwell. This was primarily due to suspicions of the conflating of various different 'Agariya' tribes with different dialects. Agariya shares similarities to languages such as Chhattisgarhi, Odia, and Sambalpuri.
