= Koda language =

Munda language of eastern India

Koda
- কোডা
- The word "Koda" written in Nag Chiki script
- Native to: India, Bangladesh
- Ethnicity: 263,178 Kora
- Native speakers: 47,268 (2011 census)
- Language family: Austroasiatic: Munda; North; Kherwarian; Mundaric; Koda
- Writing system: Nag Chiki; Bengali–Assamese script; Devanagari; Roman letters

Language codes
- ISO 639-3: cdz
- Glottolog: koda1236
- ELP: Koda

Koda, also known as Kora, Kaora, Korali, Korati, Kore, Mudi, Mudikora, Sing, Nagbongsi, and Sardar, is an endangered Munda language of India and Bangladesh spoken by the Kora. The Kora mainly live in West Bengal, in the districts of Paschim Medinipur and Bankura, with a few in neighbouring Odisha and Jharkhand. In 2005, there were 1,300 speakers in the Rajshahi Division of Bangladesh, though many said that Bengali was their best language. Koda is closely related to the Kol language.

Kim et al. (2010) considers Koda and Kol to be Mundari cluster languages. Koda-speaking villages include Kundang and Krishnupur in Rajshahi Division, Bangladesh, while Kol villages include Babudaing village.

Koda verbs are inflected for tense-aspect-mood and person, number, finite/infinite, subject/object, possessor, animacy and transitivity. In recent times Koda is code-mixing with Bangla: including vocabulary replacement and greater adoption of Bengali syntax. These processes are seen more in younger speakers.

Shamim (2021) presents a description of the phonology and morphology of Koda. It also presents a study of Koda in the context of language contact.

== Phonology ==
=== Consonants ===
Consonants
			Bilabial	Dental/ Alveolar	Retroflex	Palatal	Velar	Glottal
Plosive	voiceless	unaspirated	p	t̪	ʈ	c	k	ʔ
Plosive	voiceless	aspirated	(pʰ)	(t̪ʰ)	(ʈʰ)	(cʰ)	(kʰ)	
Plosive	voiced	unaspirated	b	d̪	ɖ	ɟ	g	
Plosive	voiced	aspirated	(bʱ)	(d̪ʱ)	(ɖʱ)	(ɟʱ)	(gʱ)	
Fricative						ʃ		h
Nasal			m	n			ŋ	
Tap				ɾ				
Approximant				l				

- The non-labial aspirated consonants (/t̪ʰ, d̪ʱ, ʈʰ, ɖʱ, cʰ, ɟʱ, kʰ, gʱ/) are found primarily in Bengali loanwords.

=== Vowels ===
Vowels
	Front	Back
Close	i	u
Mid	ɛ	ɔ
Open		ɑ

- Vowel length and nasalization are not contrastive. Nasal vowels in Bengali loanwords lose their nasality.
- Non-open vowels /ɛ, i, ɔ, u/ become semivowels [ɛ̯, i̯, ɔ̯, u̯] between vowels.
- /ɛ/ and /ɔ/ raise to [e] and [o] when the next syllable contains a close vowel.
