= Munda languages =

Austroasiatic languages spoken in the Indian subcontinent

Munda
- Geographic distribution: Indian subcontinent
- Ethnicity: Munda peoples
- Native speakers: 9–11 million (2010s est.)
- Linguistic classification: Austroasiatic: Munda
- Proto-language: Proto-Munda
- Subdivisions: North Munda; Sora–Gorum; Juang; Kharia; Gutob–Remo; Gtaʼ

Language codes
- ISO 639-2 / 5: mun
- Glottolog: mund1335
- Map of areas with significant concentration of Munda speakers

The Munda languages are a group of closely-related languages spoken by about eleven million people in India, Bangladesh and Nepal. Historically, they have been called the Kolarian languages. They constitute a branch of the Austroasiatic language family, which means they are distantly related to languages such as the Mon and Khmer languages, to Vietnamese, as well as to minority languages in Thailand and Laos and the minority Mangic languages of South China. Bhumij, Ho, Mundari, and Santali are notable Munda languages.

The family is generally divided into two branches: North Munda, spoken in the Chota Nagpur Plateau of Jharkhand, Chhattisgarh, Bihar, Odisha and West Bengal, as well as in parts of Bangladesh and Nepal, and South Munda, spoken in central Odisha and along the border between Andhra Pradesh and Odisha.

North Munda, of which Santali is the most widely spoken and recognised as an official language in India, has twice as many speakers as South Munda. After Santali, the Mundari and Ho languages rank next in number of speakers, followed by Korku and Sora. The remaining Munda languages are spoken by small isolated groups and are poorly described.

General characteristics of the Munda languages include head-final clausal structure, the fusion of middle voice and active voice with tense-aspect-mood markers, a distinction between inclusive and exclusive first-person plural pronouns in the pronominal systems, the lack of grammatical gender as a productive category, the widespread use of numeral classifiers, and lexical words in referential function ("nouns") all have one invariable form, a distinction between alienable and inalienable possession, and rich and pervasive systems of auxiliary verb constructions (AVCs) in clausal structure. The Munda languages are generally synthetic and agglutinating. In Munda sound systems, consonant sequences are infrequent except in the middle of words.

The Munda languages are often interpreted as prime examples of father tongues since the majority of native speakers of these languages tend to display the Y-chromosome haplogroup of the original linguistic founding population in higher frequencies, and that Y-haplogroup signifies the linguistic origin, rather than based on a maternal haplogroup.

== Origin ==
Many linguists suggest that the Proto-Munda language probably split from Proto-Austroasiatic somewhere in Indochina. Studies by Chaubey et al. (2011), Arunkumaret al. (2015), Metspalu et al. (2018), and Tätte et al. (2019) all show that the Munda branch of the Austroasiatic family was created as the result of a male-biased linguistic intrusion into the Indian subcontinent from Southeast Asia during the Late Neolithic period (Sidwell & Rau 2019 cited Tätte et al. (2019), estimate a date of formation between 3,800 and 2,000 years ago), which carried the paternal lineage O1b1a1a into India from either Meghalaya or the sea. These studies and analyses confirm George van Driem's Munda Father tongue hypothesis. Paul Sidwell (2018) suggests they arrived on the coast of modern-day Odisha about 4000–3500 years ago (c. 2000 – c. 1500 BCE) and spread after the Indo-Aryan migration to the region.

Rau and Sidwell (2019), along with Blench (2019), suggest that Pre-Proto-Munda had arrived in the Mahanadi River Delta around 1500 BCE from Southeast Asia via a maritime route, rather than overland. The Munda languages then subsequently spread up the Mahanadi watershed. 2021 studies suggest that Munda languages impacted Eastern Indo-Aryan languages.

Present-day distribution of Austroasiatic languages

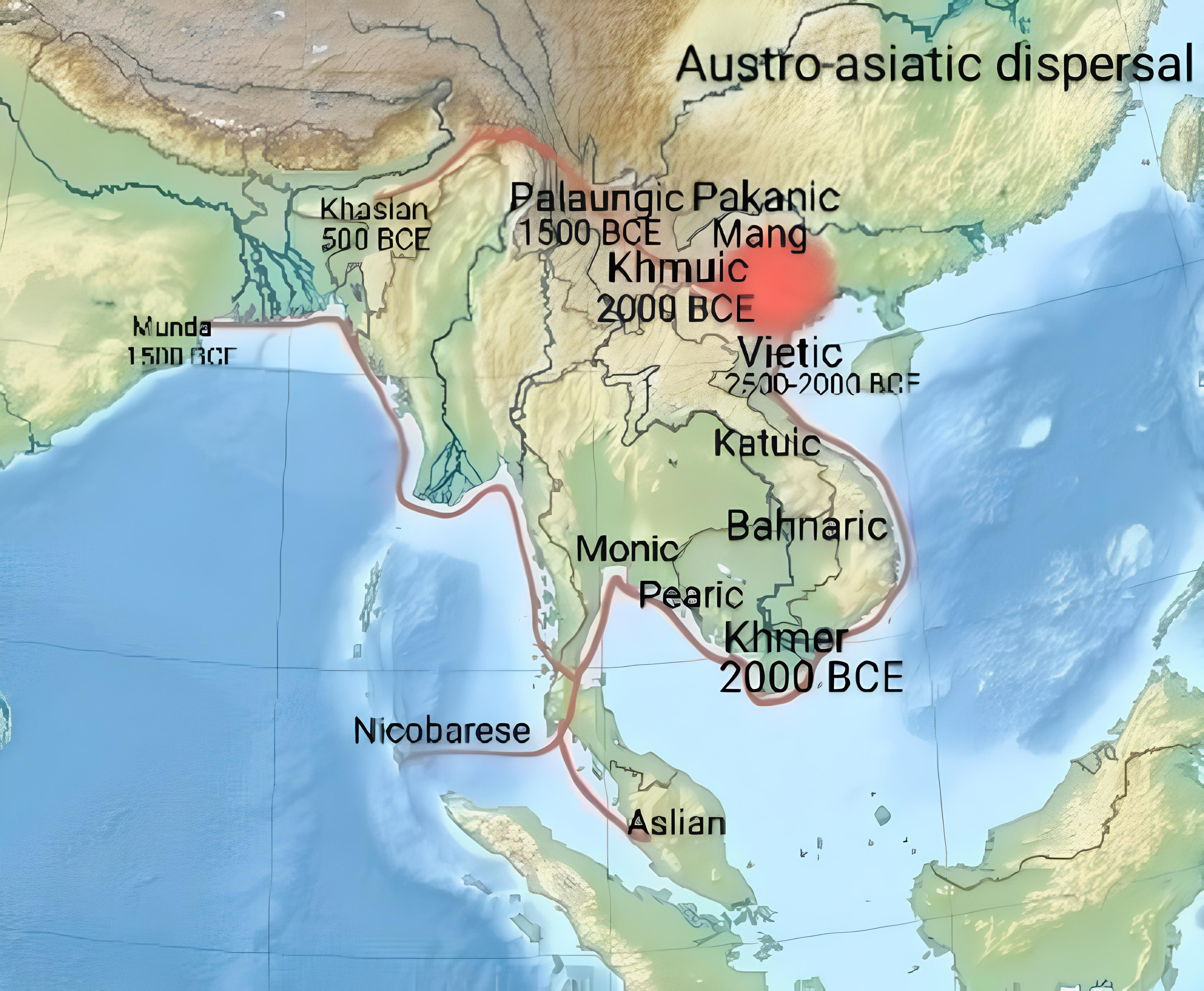
Austro-asiatic dispersal map

== Classification ==
=== Internal classification ===
==== Diffloth (1974) ====
The bipartite Diffloth (1974) classification is widely cited:

- Munda
  - North Munda
    - Korku
    - Kherwarian
      - Kherwari branch: Birjia, Koraku
      - Mundari branch: Mundari, Bhumij, Asuri, Koda, Ho, Birhor, Kol, Turi
      - Santal branch: Santali, Mahali
  - South Munda
    - Kharia–Juang: Kharia, Juang
    - Koraput Munda
      - Remo branch: Gata (Gta), Bondo (Remo), Bodo Gadaba (Gutob)
      - Savara branch [Sora–Juray–Gorum] : Parengi (Gorum), Sora (Savara), Juray, Lodhi

==== Diffloth (2005) ====
Diffloth (2005) retains Koraput (rejected by Anderson, below) but abandons South Munda and places Kharia–Juang with the northern languages:

- Munda
  - Koraput
    - Remo
    - Savara
  - Core Munda
    - Kharia–Juang
    - North Munda
      - Korku
      - Kherwarian

==== Anderson (1999) ====
Anderson's 1999 proposal is as follows.

- Munda
  - North Munda
    - Korku
    - Kherwarian: Santali, Mundari
  - South Munda (3 branches)
    - Kharia–Juang: Juang, Kharia
    - Sora–Gorum: Sora, Gorum
    - Gutob–Remo–Gtaʔ
      - Gutob–Remo: Gutob, Remo
      - Gtaʼ: Plains Gtaʔ, Hill Gtaʔ

However, in 2001, Anderson split Juang and Kharia apart from the Juang-Kharia branch and also excluded Gtaʔ from his former Gutob–Remo–Gtaʔ branch. Thus, his 2001 proposal included five branches for South Munda.

==== Anderson (2001) ====
Anderson (2001) follows Diffloth (1974) apart from rejecting the validity of Koraput. He proposes instead, on the basis of morphological comparisons, that Proto-South Munda split directly into Diffloth's three daughter groups, Kharia–Juang, Sora–Gorum (Savara), and Gutob–Remo–Gtaʼ (Remo).

His South Munda branch contains the following five branches, but the North Munda branch is the same as those of Diffloth (1974) and Anderson (1999).

Sora–Gorum Juang ↔ Kharia ↔ Gutob–Remo ↔ Gtaʔ

- Note: "↔" = shares certain innovative isoglosses (structural, lexical). In Austronesian and Papuan linguistics, this has been called a "linkage" by Malcolm Ross.

==== Sidwell (2015) ====
Paul Sidwell (2015) considers Munda to consist of 6 coordinate branches, and does not accept South Munda as a unified subgroup.

- Munda
  - North Munda
    - Korku
    - Kherwarian (Santali, Munda)
  - Sora–Gorum
  - Juang
  - Kharia
  - Gutob–Remo
  - Gtaʔ

=== External classification ===
Traditionally, the Austroasiatic phylum was divided into two primary groups, Mon-Khmer and Munda, following Schmidt (1906)'s classification. Sebeok (1942) and Pinnow (1959, 1960, 1963) later reinforced this model, attributing the distinction to the typological contrast between the geographically eastern Mon-Khmer (Pinnow's Khmer-Nicobar) and the South Asian Munda branch. This binary classification, however, overlooks lexical evidence, the effects of language contact and areal convergence that may have profoundly shaped the structure of individual branches. Pinnow (1963:150) himself acknowledged that his classification "[...]have only structural and geographical justification." As comparative-historical research progressed, alternative hypotheses concerning the external position of Munda emerged. During the 1970s and 1980s, Diffloth and Shorto independently came up with a hypothesis that suggests recognizing the phylum as made up of two Northern and Southern phylogenetic groups on the basis of shared lexical innovations and the *s-:*t- correspondence in minor syllables. Under this hypothesis, Munda formed part of the Northern group together with Khasian, Palaungic, Khmuic, Mang, and Vietic. Sidwell (2014), however, argues that Munda lacks convincing lexical and structural innovations linking it to this putative Northern subgroup. He further notes that the lexical isoglosses required to unite Mang-Pakanic with the Khasi-Palaungic group are also absent.

A computational phylogenetic analysis study conducted by Sidwell & Greenhill (2014) found no evidence supporting a higher-level Mon-Khmer v. Munda division. Instead, the Austroasiatic family was optimally resolved into eleven primary nodes, with Munda recovered as a coherent coordinate branch equivalent in rank to the other major lineages. The analysis therefore provides no support for treating Munda as the sister group of a monophyletic Mon-Khmer subgroup.

== Sociolinguistics and history of Munda studies ==
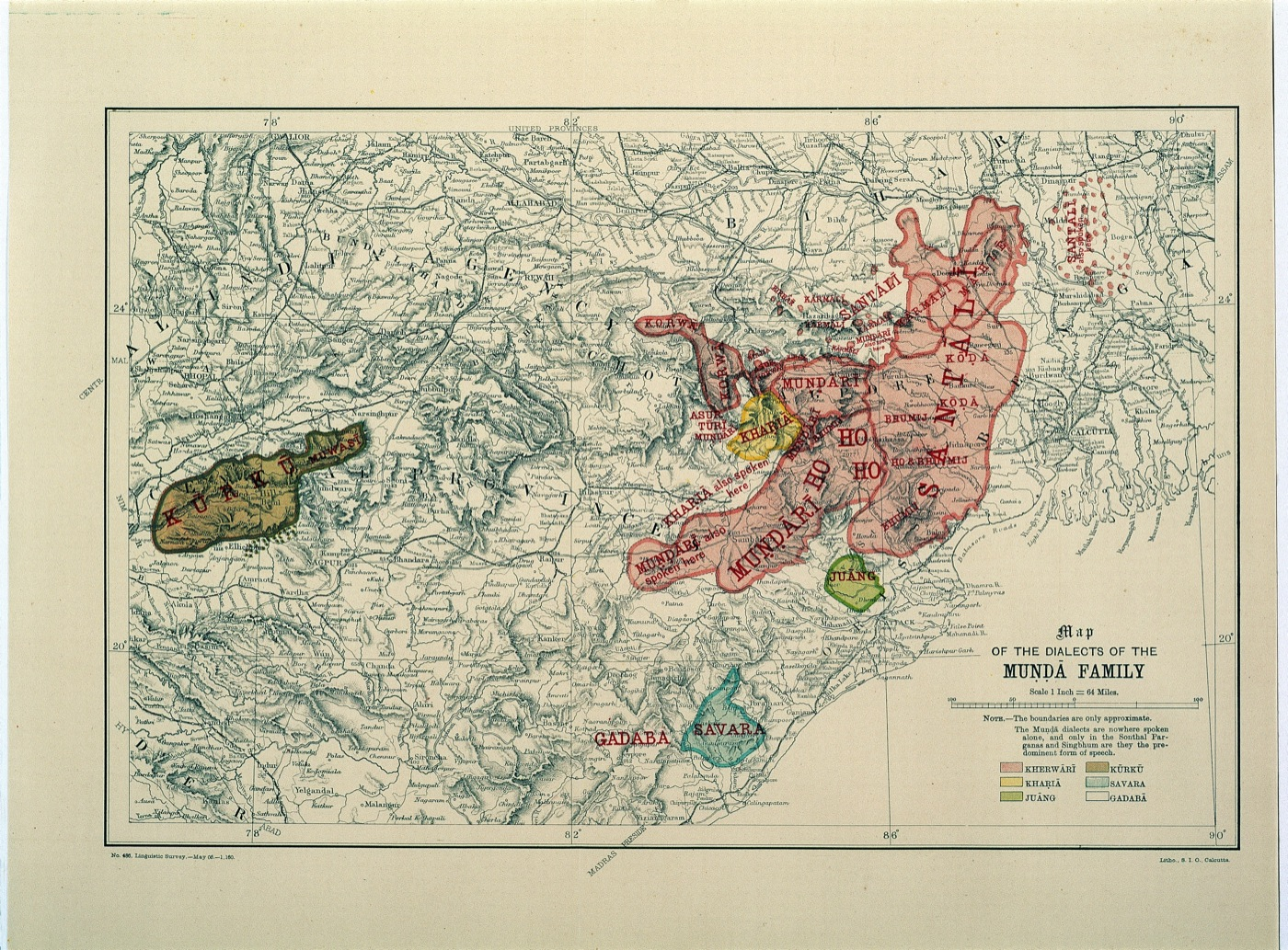
Grierson's Linguistic Map of India, 1906

The Munda languages are the least documented languages in South Asia. Most Munda languages, except Santali with ~8 million native speakers, can be tentatively described as under threat, with Mundari (~1.5 million), Ho (~1 million), Korku (~400,000), Kharia (~200,000), and Sora (~250,000–300,000) still maintaining substantial everyday usage; smaller South Munda languages such as Juang, Gtaʔ, Remo, Birhor, and Gorum survive in small, fragmented populations amidst more than half a billion Indo-Aryan and Dravidian speakers in one of the most densely populated regions on Earth. Speakers are concentrated in central and eastern India, especially Jharkhand, Odisha, West Bengal, Madhya Pradesh, Maharashtra, and adjacent regions, typically in hill and forest zones, which Peterson (2017) terms accretion zones. Literacy rates are usually low among speakers, and opportunities for daily communication to be written down are largely restricted to the larger languages. Multilingualism is widespread, with frequent use of Hindi, Bengali, Sardi, Odia, Marathi, Telugu, and other regional languages in administration, trade, and education.

Munda languages have long been affected by social stigmas because their speakers, mainly belonging to Adivasi, Dalit, and other socially marginalized communities, have historically occupied subordinate positions within the regional caste and socioeconomic hierarchy. Although folk literatures are abundant, it is not so surprising that the Munda languages lack written literature before the 19th century; the same can be said of other languages spoken by dalit and tribal communities (adivasi) of South Asia (Brahui, Kurukh, Bhili, Burushaski, Nihali, etc). Colonial and postcolonial attitudes often viewed tribal populations as "primitive" and backward, and these perceptions became attached to their languages, which dominant groups frequently regarded as rural and lacking prestige. The dominance of regional Indo-Aryan languages such as Hindi, Bengali, Odia, and Sardi in education, administration, religion, and public life further reinforced this hierarchy, constantly pressuring many Munda speakers to shift toward socially prestigious majority languages.

Long-term intense contact has led to extensive Aryanization. Some communities formerly associated with Munda languages have largely abandoned them and now speak Indo-Aryan varieties instead. Turi is a clear example: although it is genetically a North Munda language, most ethnic Turi no longer speak it fluently with just over 0.56% of the Turi population use the language in daily life. Birhor communities, meanwhile, increasingly adopt Sardi and Hindi. Similar pressures affect Kharia-speaking regions, where prolonged interaction with neighboring Indo-Aryan populations and Kherwarian groups has produced strong lexical and structural convergence. In several South Munda communities, monolingual speakers have disappeared entirely. Certain Indo-Aryan speaking groups in the lowland plain may have originally Munda speakers who went through Aryanization, such as the Cheros of Bihar, the Lohar weavers of Ranchi, the Musahars and Tharus of lowland Nepal, and the Sahariya of Eastern Uttar Pradesh.

The contact situation certainly is not one-directional, however. Some large Munda languages, like Kherwarian Mundari and Santali, have also been adopted by neighboring non-Munda populations through close social and economic interaction. The Dravidian Kurukhs of Ranchi adopted a Mundari dialect called Keraʔ Mundari, and certain low-caste Indo-Aryan communities in the Ranchi region also speak Mundari as a community language. As a result, ethnic and linguistic identities do not always align neatly in eastern and central India. The modern sociolinguistic landscape of the Munda family is therefore shaped simultaneously by language loss, assimilation, bilingualism, and localized language expansion through contact. Following Nichols' (1992, 1997) conceptual distinction between spread zones and accretion zones, Peterson (2021) argues that the present distribution of the Munda languages largely reflects their survival in residual hilly regions rather than their original extent. In the prehistoric era, egalitarian Munda-speaking and pre-Munda-speaking agricultural communities might have once dominated much of the Eastern Gangetic Plains and adjacent regions before the expansion of Indo-Aryan languages by at least 600 BCE. Subsequent period of intensive interaction with non-Munda speakers, Munda speakers, and Indo-Aryan speakers in the spread zone of the plains may have resulted in large-scale language shift, forming the Jharkhand-Bihar-West Bengal linguistic area, clearly aligns with the Indo-Aryan East-West morphosyntactical split today, as Munda speakers were assimilated or reduced to accretion zones of the mountains and hills where their languages and tribal identities survived.

As for the reconstructed history of the Munda languages, researchers primarily rely on verbal morphology to define Munda classification. Lexical and phonological features are also significant, but they tend to reflect their respective regional linguistic areas and are thus less reliable indicators of phylogeny. Verbal morphology is far less likely to be diffused and requires long-term intimate contact between different ethnolinguistic groups. From the morphological perspective, it is pretty straightforward that the Munda languages are divided into six coordinate branches: North Munda, Sora-Juray–Gorum, Gutob-Remo, Kharia, Juang, and Gtaʔ. Previous scholars emphasized a North-South Munda division; however, with new clues suggested by scholars such as David Stampe and Felix Rau, it has become more evident that the North-South divide may have never existed. The contiguous North Munda continuum remained stable with relatively minimal diversification for a long period until a northward expansion of Dravidian-speaking groups such as the Gonds, Kurux, and Malto likely cut off the land bridge between the Korku and the Kherwarians. Some morphological similarities shared between Kharia and Remo-Gutob may be attributed to a period of common development of their proto-forms. At some point in distant history, Proto-Gtaʔ perhaps came under areal influence of Proto-Gutob-Remo. Otherwise the non-North Munda branches are very old, reflecting closer to Proto-Munda structure than North Munda languages.

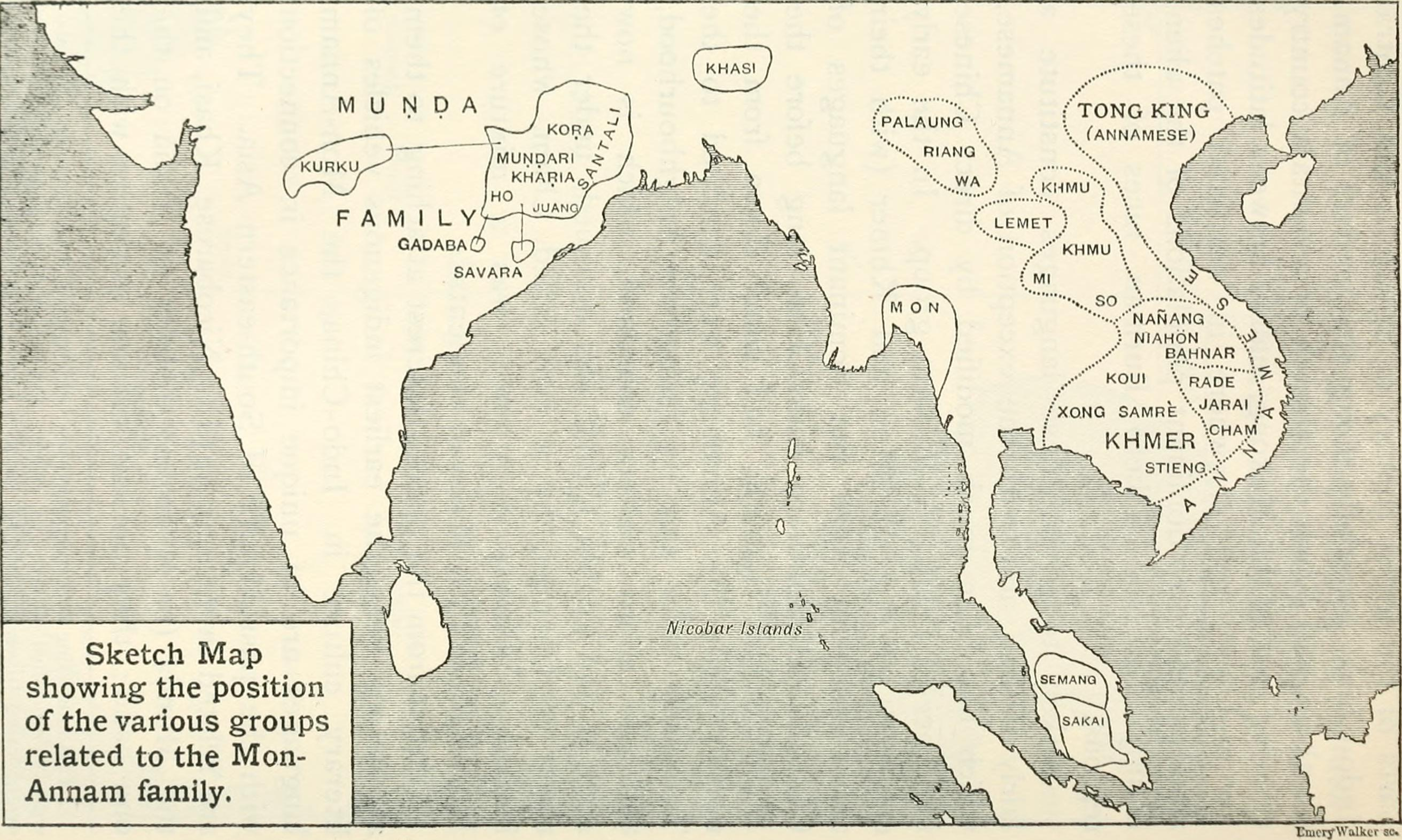
An early map of the Austroasiatic languages (known as Mon-Annam then) by Blagden, 1906

Researchers had already recognized the Austroasiatic nature of the Munda languages even before the Austroasiatic hypothesis itself was first proposed by Logan (1856). In 1848, Hodgson noticed that the so-called "Kol languages" (Ho, Santali) of Bengal constitute a third major linguistic family of India alongside Indo-Aryan and Dravidian, marking the first explicit genetic classification of the group. Few years later, British man James Logan (1850) and American Francis Mason (1854) independently advanced the genetic connection between Ho and Mon and Vietnamese. Two years later, in 1856, Logan proposed placing the "Kolarian languages" within the "Mon-Annam" language family, which was progressively developed by prominent researchers such as Cust (1878), Kuhn (1889), Bladgen (1894), Grierson (1906), and Schmidt (1906) into the Austroasiatic language family. Despite this, there have been doubts and skepticism regarding their genetic status.

Typologically, the Munda languages are structurally abnormal, not only within their own Austroasiatic phylum but also in comparison with their Indo-Aryan and Dravidian neighbors, although in certain respects it is clear that Munda has areally converged with Indo-Aryan and Dravidian within the macro South Asian linguistic area, which implies an East Asian origin of Munda in a region not too far removed from the Sino-Tibetan and Austronesian homelands. Munda shows strong traces of structural influence and lexical borrowings from a non-Indo-Aryan, non-Dravidian substrate, probably extinct contact languages that might have been dominant in the Eastern Gangetic Plains in prehistoric times before Austroasiatic pre-Proto-Munda arrival. Those substrate-influenced anomalies in Munda are so profound that many linguists find it difficult to ignore them. Some scholars in the past actually disagreed with Schmidt's Austroasiatic classification of Munda and even proposed alternative hypotheses. In a series of papers published between 1928 and 1934, Hungarian linguist Wilhelm von Hevesy attacked Schmidt's Austroasiatic classification and suggested a Finno-Ugric affiliation of Munda with an apparent Mon-Khmer substratum instead. In an approach based on structural typology in 1942, Thomas Sebeok, despite refuting Hevesy's Munda-Finno-Ugric hypothesis, he rejected any genetic connection between Munda and Vietnamese. Doubts about the Austroasiatic classification were not considerably eliminated until the works of German linguist Heinz-Jürgen Pinnow (1954, 1959), who began establishing systematic Austroasiatic lexical comparative studies and Proto-Munda reconstructions, providing the first substantial addition to Schmidt's work and the first morphological reconstruction of Proto-Munda, thus codifying Austroasiatic linguistics as a major field of linguistic study since the first hypothesis emerged in the 1850s.

== Phonology ==
=== Consonants, vowels, and syllable structure ===
The Munda languages share similar sets of phonemes with regional languages in their respective areas. Inherited Austroasiatic "checked" glottalised stop (pre-glottalised articulatory) and nasalised final consonants found in some Munda languages such as Mundari (eg. ub ("hair") is realised as [uˀb̥ᵐ]) and Kharia (eg. oreˀdʒ ("ox") is realised [ɔrɛˀɟ˺ⁿ]) may stand out in South Asia. One key feature in the Munda consonants is the distinction between dental and retroflex stops (/t̪/ vs /ʈ/, /d̪/ vs /ɖ/) in lexical level exists in most Munda languages except Sora and Gorum, reflecting a general characteristic of South Asian (Indosphere) phonology. Because of South Asian areal convergence, Munda languages generally have fewer vowels (between 5 and 10) than their Eastern Austroasiatic relatives. Additionally, Sora has glottalised vowels. Like any other Austroasiatic languages, the Munda languages make extensive uses of diphthongs and triphthongs. Larger vowel sequences can be found, with an extreme example of Santali kɔeaeae meaning ‘he will ask for him’. Most Munda languages lack tones with an exception of Korku, which has acquired two contrastive tones within the South Asian linguistic area: an unmarked high and a marked low, in which the low tone might have emerged from the putative laryngeal feature *^{χ} in a transitive past suffix of Proto-Munda. The general syllable shape is (C)V(C). Initial clusters of the prototypical Austroasiatic sesquisyllables C(C)CVC mostly appear as resyllabified in Munda languages, except Gtaʔ which is the only Munda language that allows initial clusters, eg. gsæŋ "chicken." However, scholars skeptically consider that Gtaʔ sesquisyllabic structure might have been the result of a local secondary development.

As stated above, tonogenesis in Korku and continuous CCVC/sesquisyllabic development in Gtaʔ, both of which were unfolded inside the South Asian linguistic area, which is very hostile to tone and initial clusters, seem to be local innovations and have nothing related to contact-driven restructuring in the subcontinent. It is also unclear whether they had anything connected to areal convergences in the Eastern Austroasiatic languages of Mainland Southeast Asia. Munda word shape is dictated by a general phonotactical phenomenon called bimoraic constraint, which requires free-standing nominal stems to stay disyllabic or to obtain weight at the stressed syllable; that is, monosyllabic free form of lexemes must be expanded (i.e. resyllabified and/or reduplicated) in order to remain heavy (Anderson & Zide 2001). See #Vocabulary for comparison.

=== Munda phonemes ===
The following table compiles lists of consonantal and vowel systems of several Munda languages, mainly from Anderson (2014), Nagaraja (1999), and many others on International Phonetic Alphabet.

	Plosives	Retroflex Stops	Affricates	Fricatives	Nasals	Rhotics	Laterals	Glides	Vowels
Santali	p b t d k ɡ ʔ	ʈ ɖ	t͡ʃ d͡ʒ	s h	m n ɲ ŋ	r ɽ	l	w j	a i u o e ɔ ɛ ə
Ho	p b t d k ɡ ʔ	ʈ ɖ	t͡ʃ d͡ʒ	s h	m n [ɲ] ŋ	r	l	w j	a i u o e (ɔ) (ɛ)
Mundari	p b t d k ɡ ʔ	ʈ ɖ	t͡ʃ d͡ʒ	s h	m n ɳ ɲ ŋ	r ɽ	l	w j	a i u o e
Keraʔ Mundari	p b t d k ɡ ʔ	ʈ ɖ	t͡ʃ d͡ʒ	s h	m n ɲ ŋ	r ɽ	l	w j	a i u o e
Asuri	p b t d k ɡ	ʈ ɖ	t͡ʃ d͡ʒ	s h	m n ŋ	r ɽ	l	w j	a i u o e
Kɔɖa	p b t d k ɡ ʔ	ʈ ɖ	t͡ʃ d͡ʒ	ʃ h	m n ŋ	ɾ	l	i̯ u̯	ɑ i u ɔ ɛ
Birhoɽ	p b t d k ɡ ʔ	ʈ ɖ	t͡ʃ d͡ʒ	s ʃ h	m n ɳ ɲ ŋ	r ɽ	l	j	a i u ɔ ɛ
Birjia	p b t d k ɡ ʔ	ʈ ɖ	t͡ʃ d͡ʒ	s ç h	m n ɲ ŋ	r ɽ	l	w j	a i u o e ɔ ɛ ə
Turi	p b t d k ɡ ʔ	ʈ ɖ	t͡ʃ d͡ʒ	s h	m n ɳ ɲ ŋ	ɾ ɽ	l	ʋ j	ɑ i u ɔ ɛ ə
Korku	p b t d k ɡ ʔ	ʈ ɖ	t͡ʃ d͡ʒ	v s h	m n ɳ ɲ ŋ	r ɽ	l	w j	a i u o e
Kharia	p b t d k ɡ ʔ	ʈ ɖ	t͡ʃ d͡ʒ	f v s h	m n ɲ ŋ	r ɽ	l	w j	a i u o e
Juang	p b t d k ɡ	ʈ ɖ	t͡ʃ d͡ʒ	s	m n ɳ ɲ ŋ	r	l ɭ	j	a i u o e ɔ
Sora	p b t d k ɡ ʔ		(t͡ʃ) d͡ʒ	s z	m n ɲ ŋ	r ɽ	l	w j	a i u o e ɔ ɛ ə ɨ
Gorum	p b t d k ɡ ʔ			s z	m n ŋ	r ɽ	l	j	a i u e ɔ
Remo	p b t d k ɡ ʔ	ʈ ɖ	t͡ɕ d͡ʑ	v s z	m n ɲ ŋ	r ɽ	l	w j	a i u o e
Gutob	p b t d k ɡ ʔ	ʈ ɖ	t͡s d͡z t͡ʃ d͡ʒ	s z h	m n ɲ ŋ	r ɽ	l	j	a i u o e
Gtaʔ	p b t d k ɡ ʔ	ʈ ɖ	t͡ʃ d͡ʒ	s h	m n ŋ	r ɽ	l	w j	a i u o e æ/ɛ (ɨ)

=== Word prominence ===
Donegan & Stampe (2004) posited overarching assumptions that all Munda languages have completely redesigned their word prosodic structure from proto-Austroasiatic rising intonation, iambic and reduced vowel, sesquisyllabic structure to Indic norms of trochaic, falling rhythm, stable or assimilationist consonants and harmonised vowels, making them typological opposed to Eastern Austroasiatic languages at almost every level. Sidwell & Rau (2014) criticised Donegan & Stampe by pointing out that the overall picture appears much more complicated and diverse and that generalisations of Donegan & Stampe are not supported by the instrumental data of the various Munda languages. Peterson (2011b) describes word-rising contour in monosyllables and second syllable prominence in Kharia content words. Even the presence of clitics and affixes does not drive Kharia word prosodic structure to that of a trochaic and falling system. Osada (2008) reports final-syllable stress in all but CVC.CV stems in Mundari. Horo & Sarmah (2015), Horo (2017) and Horo, Sarmah & Anderson (2020) found that the Sora disyllables are always iambic, reduced first syllable vowel space, and second syllable prominence. Even CV.CCə words show final-syllable prominence. Horo & Sarmah (2015) note that the Sora vowels of the first syllables are centralised and that vowels in the second syllables are more representative of the canonical vowel space.

Ghosh (2008) describes about Santali prosody that "stress is always released in the second syllable of the word regardless of whether it is an open or a closed syllable". His analysis was confirmed by Horo & Anderson (2021), whose acoustic data clearly shows that the second syllable in Santali is always the prominent syllable, with a greater intensity of stress and a rising contour.

Zide (2008) reports that in Korku, the final syllable is heavier than the initial syllable, and within a disyllable, stress is preferentially released at the final syllable. The analyses inferred from fieldworks demonstrate that despite exhibiting some variants, most Munda prominence alignments are in line with other Austroasiatic languages, with a predictable final-syllable prominence in a prosodic word. Again, Donegan & Stampe (2004)'s claim on rhythmic holism does not conform with the data presented by individual Munda languages.

== Morphology ==
Morphologically, both North and South Munda subgroups mainly focus on the head or the verb, thus they are primarily head-marking, in contrast to the Indo-European and Dravidian languages, which are mainly dependent-marking. As a result, nominal morphology is less complex than is verbal morphology. Case markers on nominals to show syntactic alignments (nominative-accusative or ergative-absolutive) are largely absent or not systematically developed in the Munda languages, especially the Kherwarian lects. The relation between subject and object in clause is conveyed mainly through verbal referent indexation and word order. At the clause/sentence level, Munda languages are head-final but internally head-first in referent indexation, compounds, and noun incorporation verb complexes.

Munda head-first, bimoraic constraint-free noun incorporation is also found in Khasian, Nicobaric, and other Mon-Khmer languages. In word derivation, besides their own innovative methods, the Munda languages maintain Austroasiatic methods in forms of reduplication, compounding, and derivational infixation and prefixation.

One unusual characteristic that appears to be pervasive among the Munda languages is lexical flexibility, that is, a large number to almost entire their lexicons are precategorial, i.e. lexically underspecified for categories such as noun, verb, adjectives etc. Thus, these languages may rely more on syntax and affixes/clitics to distinguish parts of speech. Pinnow summarised the issue back in the 1960s,

[...]Theoretically any word for any concept, i.e., all words, can function as a verb base. Thus, we may not speak of a verb in the Indo-European sense. This fact was recognized at an early date and is now generally known. This is true for all Munda languages, but cannot be considered distinctive of them since there are innumerable other language families in which the situation is the same.[...] This phenomenon undoubtedly goes back to very ancient times and can probably be accepted as Proto-Munda.

— Heinz-Jürgen Pinnow, 1966:101

The following elicited examples from Simdega Kharia illustrate the problem:

lebu ɖel=ki
man come=MID.PST
'The/A man came.'

Bhagwan lebu=ki ro ɖel=ki
God man=MID.PST and come=MID.PST
'God became man (Jesus) and came (to earth).'

The degree of lexical flexibility are extremely prominent in North Munda and Kharia, where the lexicons may only contain an open class of contentives; whereas in other South Munda languages this phenomenon however tends to be much weaker.

=== North Munda ===
The North Munda subgroup is split between Korku and the 14 Kherwarian languages.

==== Kherwarian languages ====
Kherwarian is a large language continuum with speakers extending west to east from the Indian states of Uttar Pradesh to Assam, north to south from Nepal to Odisha. They include fourteen languages: Asuri, Birhor, Bhumij, Koda, Ho, Korwa (Korowa), Mundari, Mahali, Santali, Turi, Agariya, Bijori, Koraku, and Karmali, with the total number of speakers surpassing ten million (2011 census). The Kherwarian languages are often highlighted because their elaborate and complex templatic and pronominalised predicate structures are so pervasive that it is obligatory for the verb to encode tense–aspect–mood, voices, transitivity, and indexation of two arguments, including outside arguments like possessors.

Kherwarian languages	Examples
Santali	gəi=ko idi-ke-d-e-tiɲ-a cow=3PL.SUBJ take-AOR-TR-3SG.OBJ-1SG.POSS-FIN "They took my cow."
Mundari	maŋɖi seta-ko=ɲ om-a-d-ko-a food dog-PL=1SG.SUBJ give-BEN-TR-3PL.OBJ-FIN "I gave the food to the dogs."
Ho	abu hotel-te=bu senoʔ-tan-a=bu 1PL hotel-ABL=1PL.SUBJ go-PROG-FIN=1PL.SUBJ "We are going to/from the hotel."
Asuri	iŋ ceŋa=ke t̪owa ujuɁ-ci-l=iŋ; I child=ACC milk fall-CAUS-PST=1SG 'I made the child spill milk.
Bhumij (Note: Some Hinduized Munda tribes use Hindi oblique marker ke which is absent in core Munda languages.)	hɔɽɔta-ke lel-(dʒaʔt)-dʒi-a=iŋ man.CLF-OBL see-PROG.TR-3SG.OBJ-FIN=1SG.SUBJ "I am looking at the man."
Koda	aku haku ʃaʔa-ku-t̪a-a=ku They fish catch-3PL.OBJ-IPFV-FIN=3PL.SUBJ 'Do they catch fish?'
Korwa	mene-m em-ga-d-iñ-a NEG-2SG.SUBJ give-BEN-TR-1SG.OBJ-FIN 'You haven't given to me.'
Turi	sarag nilija ɲɛl-ɔʔ-ɛn=ə=ɛ sky blue see-PST-MID=FIN=3SG.SUBJ 'The sky looks (lit. is seen [as]) blue.'
Birhor	iŋ am=ke nel-me-kanken=ĩ 1SG 2SG=OBL see-2SG.OBJ-IMPERF=1SG.SUBJ "I was looking at you."

Noun incorporation is often described as an ancestral Munda morphological feature and is essential to the grammar of other South Munda languages such as Sora, but the Kherwarian languages appear to have lost noun incorporation altogether. Nevertheless, rare instances of noun incorporation may be found in some archaic Kherwarian registers and oral literature.

tʃeɳe-ko nam-oɽaʔ-ta-n-a=ko
bird-PL find-house-ASP-INTR-FIN=3PL.SUBJ
"...the birds are getting into their nests (and trying to lay an egg)."

==== Korku ====
Unlike the Kherwarian languages, with their complex verbal morphology, Korku verbs are moderately simple, with a modest amount of synthesis. Korku lacks person/number indexing of subject(s)/actor (except third persons of locative copulas and nominal predicates in the locative case) and independent present/future tense markers. Korku present/future tenses rely on the finitising suffix -bà. Present or future tense negation can be located in preverbal or postverbal positions, but past tense negation is marked by the suffix -ᶑùn.

Many Korku auxiliary verbs are borrowed from Indo-Aryan. The auxiliary verb takes tense–aspect–mood, voice, and finite suffixes for the lexical verb. An example is ghaʈa-, which means 'to manage to, to find a way to' and serves as the acquisitive.

=== South Munda ===
Compared to North Munda languages, South Munda languages are even more divergent and have fewer shared morphological traits. Even the classification of Munda languages is controversial, and South Munda does not seem to exist as a valid taxon. However, South Munda languages retain many notable characteristics of the original Proto-Munda such as prefix slots and scope-ordering of referent indexation and so they represent the less restructured morphology of Munda and reflect the older Proto-Munda and Proto-Austroasiatic structures.

==== Kharia ====
In Kharia, subject markers index not only dual/plural exclusive/inclusive but also honorific status. Objects are not marked in the predicate but instead by the oblique case: -te.

There is a reduplicated free-standing form of finite predicates that behaves differently from the simple predicative base. In the predicate, reduplicated free-standing form never marks tense–aspect–mood and person. That causes the free-standing form to be used in subordination, an attributive function corresponding more or less to relative clauses. Kharia is perhaps the only Munda language that has a infinitive on predicates, =na. The infinitive can serve also as a nominaliser: jib=na=te ‘touching’.

Non-finite class
	Simple verb root	Free-standing form
live	borol	borol
open	ruʔ	ruʔruʔ
see	yo	yoyo

Like in Hindi and Sadani, Kharia has made a calque to form sequential converbs (conjunctive participles) kon (derived from ikon, ‘do’). They denote the completion of an action before another begins.

The negation particle um attaches or fuses person/number/honorific of the subject argument.

==== Juang ====
Juang exhibits nominative-accusative alignment with unmarked subject/agents and marked objects or patients.

In Juang, a pro-drop language, verbs can index both two core arguments in a transitive predicate, but not frequently. If the arguments are not omitted, referent indexation is largely optional. Juang has a fairly complex tense–aspect–mood system, which is often divided into two sets: I for transitive verbs and II for intransitive verbs. The verb "be" is usually omitted in the present tense and with a predicate adjective in sentences.

Abu muintɔ dakotoro
Abu one doctor
"Abu is a doctor."

There are two types of negation markers. Pronominal negation markers are specific for person/number of subject or object arguments. General negation markers such as -jena make up for the lack of a first-person singular negative. Negatives are ambifixative but usually precede the verb stem. There are double negations: combinations of two negatives. The negated verb may reduplicate itself.

apa a-ma-dʒim-ke ete ain kikib dʒena
2DU 2DU.SUBJ-NEG-eat-PRES.TR because 1SG RED~do NEG.COP
"Because you don’t eat (it), I didn’t do it."

Noun incorporation is fossilised in lexical compounds and words like body parts being combined with the verb "wash". Note that the head precedes the incorporated object, as opposed to the head-final position in normal clauses.

am am-a itim-de mi-gui-di-agan
you you-GEN hand:2-DEF 2SG.SUBJ-wash-hand-PST
"You washed your hand."

==== Gtaʔ-Remo-Gutob ====
The southernmost Gtaʔ and Remo-Gutob subgroups of South Munda exhibit significant morphological convergence towards Dravidian languages. Auxiliary verb constructions are heavily employed. Doubly-inflected auxiliary verb constructions are common in Gutob and Gorum, which reflects Dravidian influence. Gtaʔ-Remo-Gutob apparently have either altogether lost or not developed object indexation. Thus, they can only employ the dependent-marking strategy in differential argument marking. Examples of each languages:

1. Remo (Anderson, field notes)

niŋ a-no dʒuʔ-t-iŋ
I OBL-you see-NPST-1
'I see you.'

2. Gutob

niŋ ta sobu paiʈi niŋ ɖem=oʔ=niŋ beɖ-beɖ=niŋ
I DISC all work I do=MID.PST=1SG RDPL~AUX=1SG
'I did all the work.'

3. Hill Gtaʔ (Anderson, field notes)

ŋku gubuʔ=kə goʔ=gə
tiger pig=OBL die=EVID
'The tiger killed the pig.'

Negation in Gutob is the most complex among the Munda languages. Like for other Munda languages, Gtaʔ-Remo-Gutob have lexical noun incorporation. Gtaʔ retains some instances of unproductive incorporation of body parts to the verb "wash" like Juang, which may fit Mithun (1984)'s type II of incorporation.

==== Sora-Gorum ====
A native speaker discussing information access and welfare in Juray language in 2019

A Gorum-language speaker discussing the issues with native language education due to lack of books and teachers

The Sora-Gorum languages consist of Sora, Gorum, and the lesser-known Juray.They display many features that are considered to be archaic that can be dated to Proto-Munda. For mainstream South Asian languages like Indo-Aryan and Dravidian, the latter are exclusively suffixing, prefixes and infixes are unusual but quite common in Austroasiatic languages, and Sora-Gorum has a prefix domain that can host several pre-stem markers. The indexation paradigm in Sora and Gorum renders the fullest form of Proto-Munda predicate structure and syntax. In practice, Sora is inclined to index only one argument. Within a transitive predicate, the object argument is ranked higher than subject, and pronouns are required.

Gorum:

ne-aj-t-om
1SG.SUBJ-splash-NPST-2SG.OBJ
"I will splash you."

Sora:

ambin mənlen a-gij-tə-len
You(Pl) we 2PL.SUBJ-see-NPST-1PL.OBJ
"You guys will see us."

ə-ədn-əl-gə/b/rɔj-l-aj
1PL.SUBJ-NEG-RECP-shame/CAUS/shame-PST-1PL.SUBJ.EXCL.ACT
"We did not shame each other."

In Sora, noun incorporation is a valency-reducing effort, close to what described by Mithun's type III incorporation. Every noun has a combining form (CF), which is a compact, compressed monosyllabic form of free-standing noun, having been stripped of its functional morphology, and does not adhere to bimoraic constraint. Only CFs are allowed to form compounds with verbs. The resulted verb-noun incorporated compound is syntactically distinct from phrases. Unlike in North Munda where it is restricted to oral literature, noun incorporation in Sora is in fact pervasive in daily conversations, with every noun except loanwords having a possible CF, which allows the creation of sequences of complex verb phrases.

ɲem-sim-ti-n-aj
catch-chicken-NPST-INTR-1SG.SUBJ
"I’m catching chicken."

paŋ-ti-dar-iɲ-ten
bring-give-cooked.rice-1SG.OBJ.UND-3SG.SUBJ.PST
"He brought and gave me cooked rice."

bagun-ben ə-il-le-ga-sal-n-ɛ
both-2PL 1/2PL.SUBJ.EXCL-go-PST-drink-liquor-INTR-2PL.SUBJ
"Both of you went and drank liquor."

əb-gan-suŋ-bji-na-ba
CAUS-enter-house-woman-OPT-1PL.SUBJ.INCL
"Let us make the woman enter the house."

dʒi-lo-si-t-am
stick-mud-hand-NPST-2SG.OBJ
"Mud will stick to your hand."

While the most salient effect of object noun incorporation in most polysynthetic languages is the lowering of the scope of the verb and the converting of transitive verbs to intransitive, incorporation of transitive subject/agent is considered atypical and occupies at the lowest position of the hierarchy. That made the incorporation of transitive subjects to have once been considered theoretically impossible by some linguists. Among all languages, there are few exceptional attested cases that permit such type of incorporation including some Athabaskan languages like Koyukon and South Slavey, and indeed, Sora.

ɲam-kid-iɲ-te
seize-tiger-1SG.OBJ-3SG.SUBJ.IMP
"Tiger may seize me" or "May I be tiger-seized."

mo-kul-t-am
swallow-ghost-NPST-2SG.OBJ
"Ghost will swallow you."

== Munda lexicon and lexical relation with other Indian language families ==
Despite some influence from neighbouring languages, the Munda languages generally maintain a solid Austroasiatic and Munda base vocabulary. The most extreme case is Sora, which has zero foreign phonemes. Agricultural-related words from Proto-Austroasiatic are widely shared (Zide & Zide 1976). Words for domesticated animal and plant species like dog, millet, chicken, goat, pig, rice are shared or semantically alternated. There are even specific terms for husked uncooked rice vs cooked rice vs rice (tree), as well as shared words used in rice production and processing like 'mortar', 'pestle', 'paddy', 'sow', 'grind/ground'. The majority of loan words from Indo-Aryan to Munda are quite recent and mostly came from Hindi. The Southern languages like Gutob have received considerable Dradivian lexical influence. A very small number of lexemes seem to be shared between Munda and Tibeto-Burman, probably reflecting earlier contact between the two groups.

It is clear that hundreds of non-Indo-European words in Vedic Sanskrit that Kuiper (1948) attributed to Munda have been rejected through careful analysis. There is a surprising absence of ancient Sanskrit and medieval Indian borrowings of animal and plant names from Munda. Scholars believe that the Munda tribes typically occupied a marginalised and lowly socioeconomic position in the Hinduized society of Vedic South Asia or did not participate in the Hindu caste system and had barely any contacts with Hindus at all. Witzel (1999) and Southworth (2005) proposed that the early non-Indo-European words with prefixes k-, ka-, ku-, cər- in Vedic Sanskrit belonged to a hypothetical 'Para-Munda substratum', which they believed to be part of the Harappan language. That would imply that Austroasiatic speakers might have penetrated as far as the Panjab and Afghanistan in the early 2nd millennium BC. However, Osada (2009) refuted Witzel and considered that those words might have been in fact Dravidian compounds.

=== Vocabulary ===
Munda basic words
gloss	Santali	Mundari	Ho	Bhumij	Korwa	Korku	Kharia	Juang	Sora	Gorum	Remo	Gutob	Gtaʔ
"hand"	ti	tii	tī	ti	tiʔi:	ti	tiʔ	iti	siʔi	siʔ	titi	titi	tti, nti
"foot"	janga	janga	–	janga	dʒaŋg	nãgà	-dʒuŋ	idʒiɲ/ŋ	dʒeʔeŋ	zḭŋ	tiksuŋ	susuŋ	nco
"eye"	mẽˀt	med	meɖ	med	meɖ	med	moˀɖ	ɛmɔɖ	mɔd/maʔd	maˀd	moʔ	moʔ	mwaʔ
"water"	daˀk	da	daʔ	daʔ	da:ʔ	dà	daʔ	dag	daʔa	ɖaʔ	daˀk	ɖaʔ	nɖiaʔ
"child"	hon	hon	hon	hon	hon	kon	konon	kɔn	oʔon	aŋon	ɔ̃ʔɔ̃	oʔn	ūhuŋo
"bear"	bana	bana	bana	bana	–	bana	bane/ai	banae	kəmbud	kibud	gibɛ	gubon	gbɛ
"tiger"	kul	kula:	kula	kula	ku:l	kula	kiɽoʔ	kiɭog	kɨna	kulaʔ	kukusa	gikil, kilo	ŋku
"dog"	seta	seta	se:ta	seta	sɛit̪a	sita	soloʔ	selog	kənsod	kusɔˀd	gusɔd	gusoʔ	gsuʔ

=== Palaungic comparison ===
Gloss	Munda	Palaungic	PAA reconstructions
'ash, dust'	Santali loboˀ 'husk, bran, meal, flour'	Bumang bua²⁴ 'stove ashes'; Palaung-Pale kbuh 'dust'	*buːh 'dust'
'bamboo'	Sora uruŋ-ən; Gorum uruŋ	U χɨ̀ʕ; Riang Lang rɤŋ¹	*krii[ŋ] 'kind of bamboo'
'bow' (n.)	Santali aˀ	Samtao ak¹; Man Met a ak⁵³ 'crossbow'	*ʔaːk 'bow' (n.)
Caladium esculentum	Santali saru; Sora saroː-n	Riang Sak sʰə̆² rôʔ¹; Wa kraɔʔ	*sroʔ 'taro'
'cattle'	Santali mihu; Ho miu 'calf'	Palaung-Namhsan mɯk; Riang Lang mɤk²	*mək~məək 'ox, cattle'
'deep'	Sora dʒaru	Bit t͡ɕruʔ ; U qú	*ɟru:ˀ 'deep'
'fire' (n.)	Santali sɛŋgɛl; Sora aŋəl-ən 'firewood'	Bumang ŋăn⁵⁵; Danau ɲɔːn⁴	*ŋal 'fire' (n.)
'husked rice'	Gutob rukuʔ; Sora roŋko-n	Hu ŋkʰóʔ; Khang năŋ⁴ kɔ¹	*rŋkoːˀ 'husked rice
'penis'	Santali lɔɟ; Korku laːɟ	Khang klɛ¹; U lì	*lɔːcˀ, *loːc 'penis'
'pestle'	Sora ɔn-rɨj-ən	Hu ŋʁíʔ; Danau t͡sʰɔŋ² réʔ³	*ɟ<nr>eːˀ 'pestle'
'old'	Santali haɽam	U χìp; Hu pʰʁím	*Criːm 'old'
'skin, hide, leather'	Santali/Mundari/Ho ur 'skin, hide'	Riang Lang huːr¹; Palaung-Rumai hu⁵¹ 'skin of animals'	*huːr 'skin' (n.)
'to beckon'	Santali ɡawiɟ	Lameet-Nkris kwaːc; Riang Lang kɤ̆² vwɑi²	*gwaːcˀ 'beckon' (v.)
'to call, shout'	Santali raˀ	Lawa ɣak; Riang Lang rɑk²	*raːkˀ 'call out, shout' (v.)
'to cover'	Santali həruˀb; Kharia raˀb 'to bury'	Riang Lang rɤp¹ 'to wrap in blanket'	*Crɨpˀ 'cover' (v.)
'to steal'	Santali kombɽo	U ŋqʰà; Lameet-Lampang ŋɣáːʔ	Cf. Proto-Palaungic *-raʔ 'to steal'
'under, beneath'	Remo aluŋ; Gutob aluŋ	Hu: tŋʁúm; U ŋχùp	*kruːm 'underneath'

== Distribution ==
Language name	Number of speakers (2011)	Location
Korwa	28,400	Chhattisgarh, Jharkhand
Birjia	25,000	Jharkhand, West Bengal
Mundari (inc. Bhumij)	1,600,000	Jharkhand, Odisha, Bihar
Asur	7,000	Jharkhand, Chhattisgarh, Odisha
Ho	1,400,000	Jharkhand, Odisha, West Bengal
Birhor	2,000	Jharkhand
Santali	7,400,000	Jharkhand, West Bengal, Odisha, Bihar, Assam, Bangladesh, Nepal
Turi	2,000	Jharkhand
Korku	727,000	Madhya Pradesh, Maharashtra
Kharia	298,000	Odisha, Jharkhand, Chhattisgarh
Juang	30,400	Odisha
Gtaʼ	4,500	Odisha
Bonda	9,000	Odisha
Gutob	10,000	Odisha, Andhra Pradesh
Gorum	20	Odisha, Andhra Pradesh
Sora	410,000	Odisha, Andhra Pradesh
Juray	25,000	Odisha
Lodhi	25,000	Odisha, West Bengal
Koda	47,300	West Bengal, Odisha, Bangladesh
Kol	1,600	West Bengal, Jharkhand, Bangladesh

== Reconstruction ==
The proto-forms have been reconstructed by Sidwell & Rau (2015: 319, 340–363). Proto-Munda reconstruction has since been revised and improved by Rau (2019).

== Writing systems ==
The following are current used alphabets of Munda languages:

- Mundari Bani (Mundari alphabet)
- Ol Chiki (Santali alphabet)
- Ol Onal (Bhumij alphabet)
- Sorang Sompeng (Sora alphabet)
- Warang Citi (Ho alphabet)

== See also ==
- Nihali language
- Munda peoples
