= Sora people =

Munda ethnic group from Southern Odisha

Sora
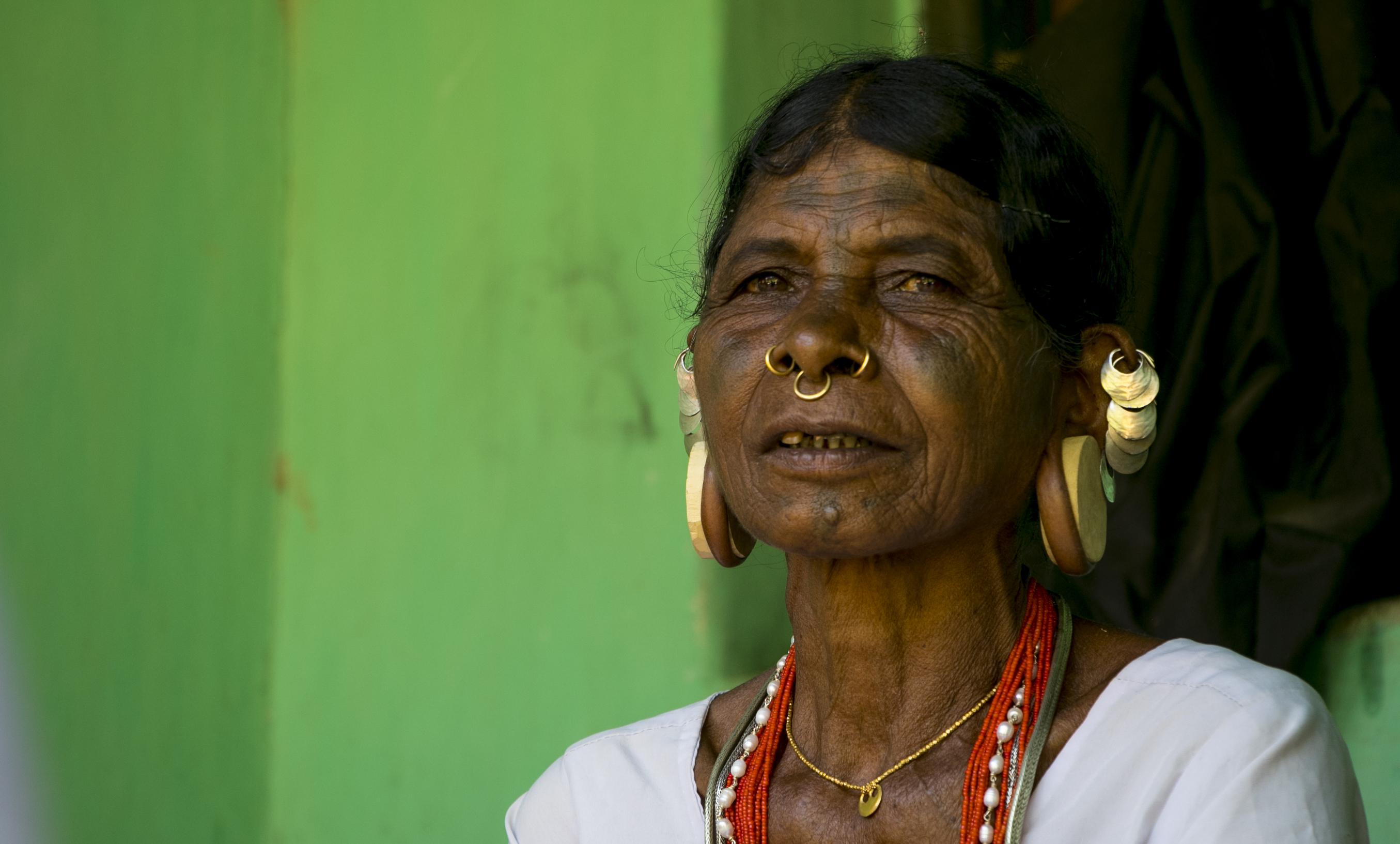
- Lanjia Sora woman in traditional jewellery in Rayagada district, Odisha, India

Regions with significant populations
- India
- Odisha: 709,349
- Andhra Pradesh: 139,424

Languages
- Sora

Religion
- Shamanism; Hinduism; Christianity (Baptism and other Protestant denominations)

Related ethnic groups
- Munda, Ho, Santhal and other Munda peoples

The Sora (alternative names and spellings include Saora, Saura, Savara and Sabara; IPA spelling: [soːra] or [soʔoːra]) are a Munda ethnic group from eastern India. They live in southern Odisha and north coastal Andhra Pradesh.

The Soras mainly live in Gajapati, Rayagada and Bargarh districts of Odisha. They are also present in Srikakulam, Vizianagaram and Visakhapatnam districts. In the census, however, some Soras are classified under Shabar or Lodha, the name for another very different Munda tribe. They inhabit blocks of Gunupur, Padmapur and Gudari. Their highest concentration is found in the Puttasingi area, approximately 25 km away from Gunupur NAC. Although, they are close to the assimilation process, yet some interior GPs like Rejingtal, Sagada and Puttasingi have Soras who still retain their traditional tribal customs and traditions.

They are known by various names such as Savara, Sabara, Sora, and Soura. They are concentrated in parts of Gunupur adjoining to the blocks of Gumma, Serango of Gajapati district. The Soras speak Sora, a Munda language. However, written language in Sora is not followed by all. They practice sedentary rice farming on terraced paddy fields in Southern Odisha Eastern Ghat hills overlooking the seaside.

They are of medium or short stature. The Savara villages consist of houses with mud walls and sedge grass roofs, usually situated in foothills. The adult men dress in a gavancha and the women in saris. They are also sometimes called Lanjia Souras due to their dress pattern of wearing a loin cloth hanging from behind and which could be mistakenly identified as a tail by a stranger.

They are endogamous and the clan, although absent, is related to Birinda, which is exogamous. Families are nuclear although joint or extended families are also found. Marriages are made by bride capture, elopement, and by negotiations.

The Sora people are a dwindling jungle tribe with a distinctive shamanic culture. According to an article in Natural History, "a shaman, usually a woman, serves as an intermediary between the two worlds [of the living and the dead]. During a trance, her soul is said to climb down terrifying precipices to the underworld, leaving her body for the dead to use as their vehicle for communication. One by one the spirits speak through her mouth. Mourners crowd around the shaman, arguing vehemently with the dead, laughing at their jokes, or weeping at their accusations."

== History ==
The Soras are mentioned under the name of Savaras in Brāhmaṇas, who associate them with the Indo-Aryan Vaidarbhas and non-Indo-Aryan Pulindas.

Graeco-Roman authors later mentioned the Soras, with Pliny calling them the "Suari" and Ptolemy calling them the "Sabarae."

== Language ==
A native speaker of the Lanjia dialect of Sora shares her experience with Aadhaar in 2019

The Sora people speak Sora, also known as Saora, Savara, or Soura, which is a South Munda language of the Austroasiatic family. It is spoken mainly in the Ganjam, Gajapati and Rayagada districts of southern Odisha and northern coastal Andhra Pradesh, with smaller communities in nearby districts and other parts of India. Many monolingual Sora speakers live in the Gumma administrative block of Gajapati whereas Sora is considered endangered, according to the International Mother Language Institute (IMLI) while Ethnologue listing it as "stable", and bilingual speakers often primarily use Odia or Telugu respectively in Odisha and Andhra Pradesh. Sora is written in several scripts, including the native Sorang Sompeng script, as well as the Latin, Odia, and Telugu scripts. Sora Sompeng was invented in 1936 by Malia Gomango and his son-in-law, Mangei Gomango, established a letterpress to print books. Ota and Patel (2021) identify several Sora dialects, including Lanjia-Sora, Imani, Kansid, Kampu, Tenkala, Sarda, and Juray. While Zide (1982) characterises Juray as a divergent variety of Sora, later studies, such as Gomango and Anderson 2017, emphasise both sociolinguistic and structural differences between Juray and Sora. Recent study by Ota and Patel (2021) has brought focus on the geographic distribution and interrelations of Sora dialects, as well as the status of Juray as an separate language.

== Culture ==
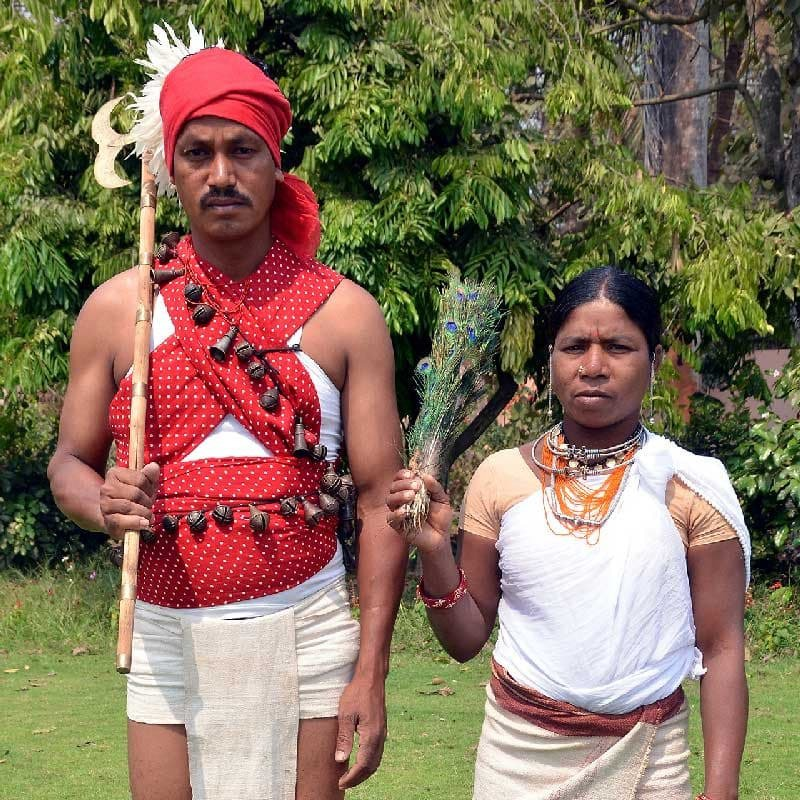
A Lanjia Saora couple

Indian Idital artist Namad Dalbehera speaking about the Idital painting in Sora language

A Sora musician and museum curator explaining "Dhinki" ("Brahma-bina" in Odia), a traditional string instrument of the Sora people, at a private museum in Paralakhemundi

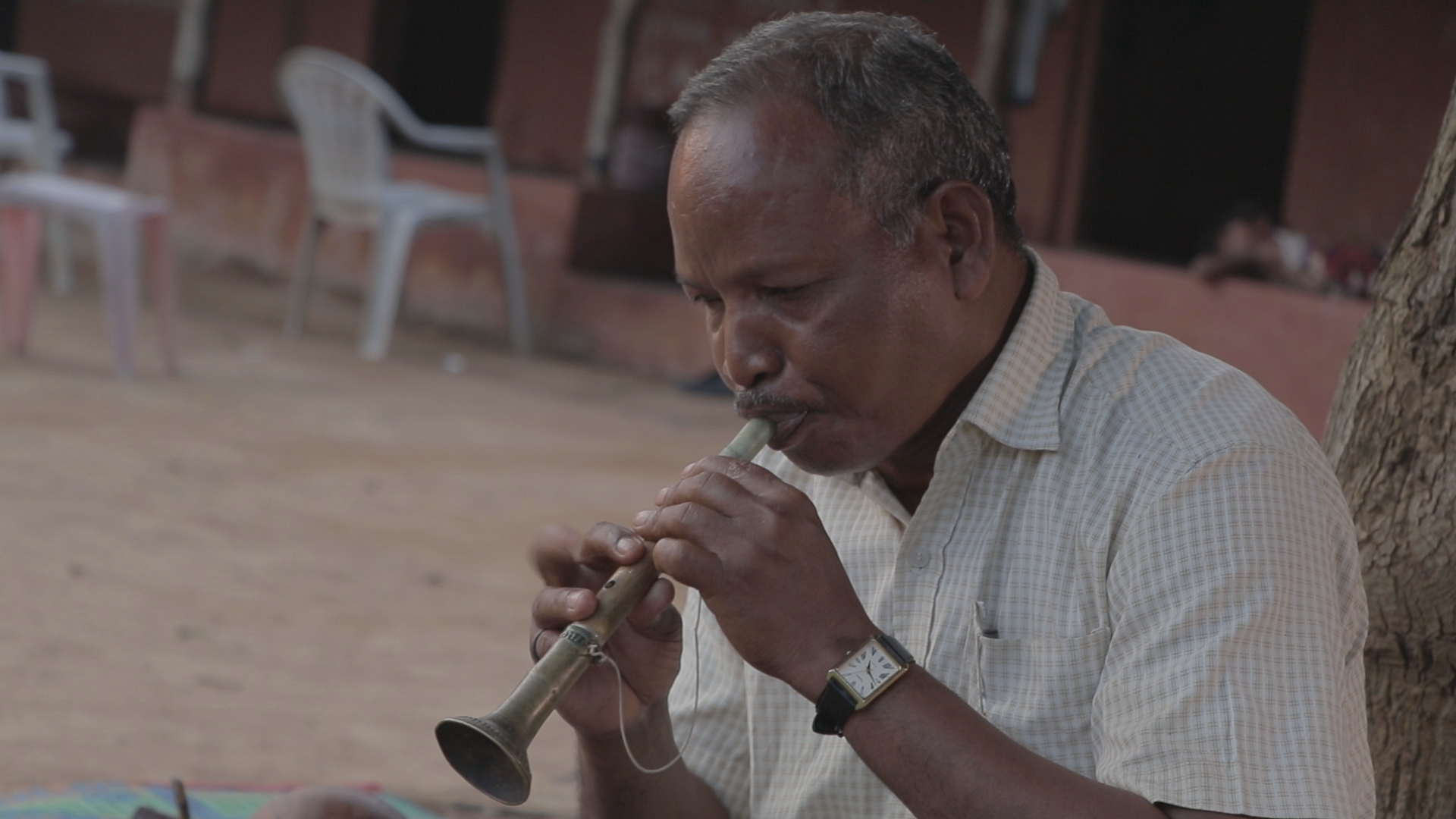
A Sora musician playing a traditional horn instrument

Instead of clan organisation they have their extended families called Birinda, which consists of descendants from a common ancestors of four to five generations. The Soras' religion is very elaborate and deep rooted. They are animist and believe in large number of deities and ancestral spirits. Dance and music constitute part and parcel of their rich aesthetic life.

The Sora family is polygamous. The total household economy revolves around the woman member who is hardworking and who helps her husband in ploughing and harvesting crops in addition to attending household chores exclusively.

The Sora people are the most prevalent practitioners of the podu cultivation system in Srikakulam district. Living high in the hills, they have little level land available and so cannot usually plough. They slash-and-burn forested land, planting millet and pulses between the tree stumps that are left and which limit the effects of erosion. After a couple of years of use, they allow the land to recover by cultivating a different area; in due course, they return to the original plot. In addition to podu, the Sora also construct irrigated terraces where it is feasible and upon those, they grow rice.

== Religion ==
The Soras are highly religious with each and every natural phenomenon attributed to the works of some Gods, deities or spirits of traditional belief. Therefore, the customary law, values, norms are highly respected by all members of the society for the fear of inviting personal or communal harms.

Sora traditional belief is a form of shamanism (Vitebsky 2017). It involves reverences of supernatural entities called the kittung, who are believed to inhabit both natural and human landscapes including forests, mountains, villages, rivers and particular locations. The Sora shamans or the kuran are female priests whose tasks are to fulfill the kittung by performing annual rituals, cattle sacrifices, dances, and offerings.

However, in the last many decades many of the traditional Sora beliefs have been superseded by Christianity that was introduced by missionaries. In many areas the shamanic and animist beliefs are distant memories, and in some areas, particularly around Puttasingh the graveyards of the ancestors have been destroyed.

Canadian and American Baptist missionaries introduced Christianity to the Sora in the early 1900s with the first Sora converts were baptised in 1905. The KJV-derived Sora Bible was published in the 1960s using Latin-based Sora alphabet. The Sora bible is held by some Christian villagers who see it as a prized household possession but not regularly spend to read it.

In Gajapati district, some up to 39 per cent of Lanjia and Jadu Sora are Christian. Sora Christians were affected by the 2008 Kandhamal violence during which a Sora church was burned down by rioters and its pastor was physically assaulted.

== Social life ==
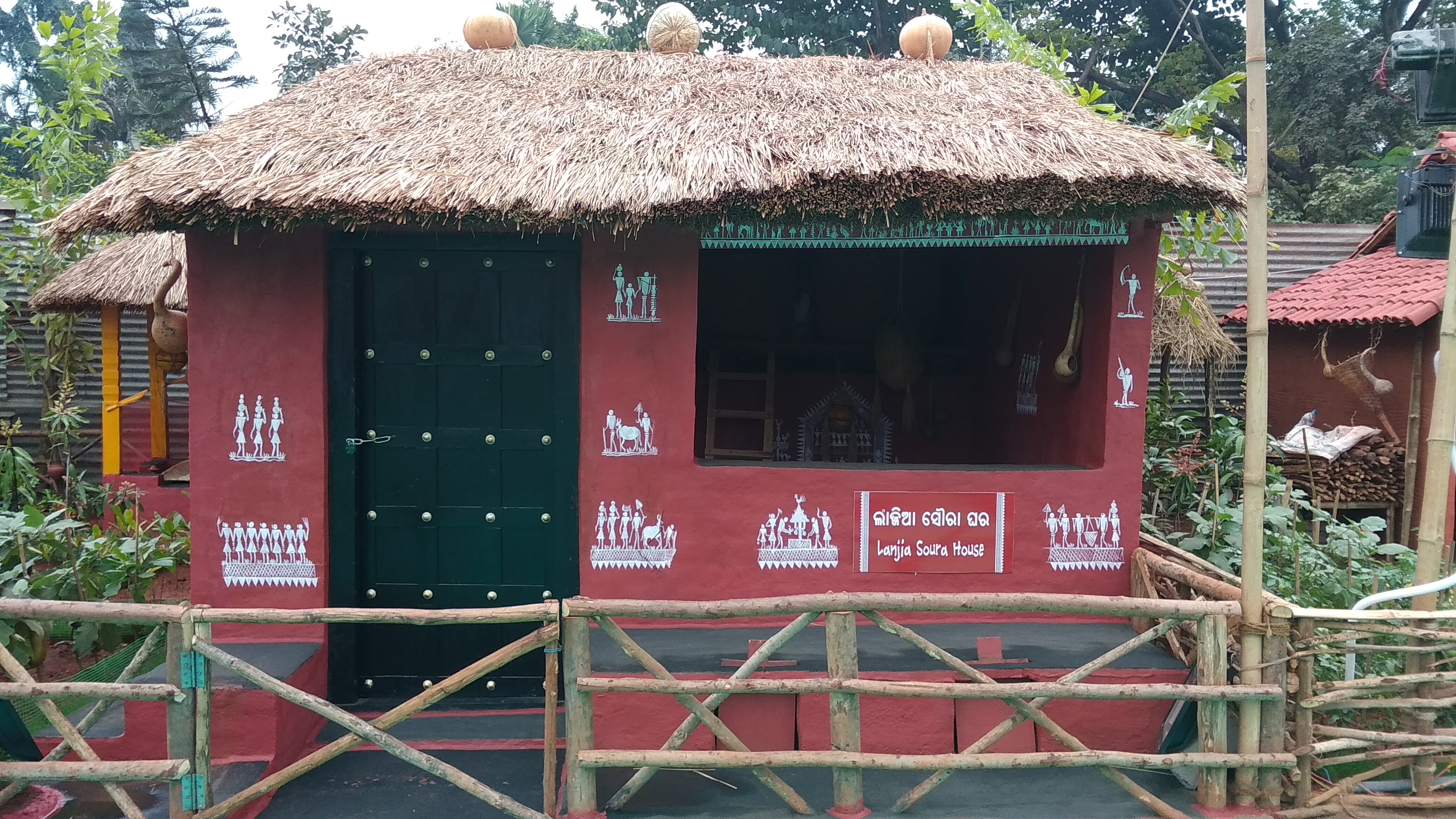
Lanjia Sora house at Odisha State Tribal fair, Bhubaneswar

The Sora have a traditional political organisation at each village and region, having hereditary post of Gomango (or Gamong; secular head), Buyya (or Buya; religious head), Mondal, Raito, and Barik (messenger). The Soras have made history in pre-British and British period and post independence as a community known for their economic and political integrity.

They practice shifting cultivation and the men hunt. A weekly market, called shandies, is an important role in the society, in the economy and in culture exchanges with other tribes and Western culture.

== Notable people ==
- Padala Bhudevi, Nari Shakti Puraskar recipient

== See also ==
- Pal Lahara State – Indian princely state
- Ranpur State – Princely state in Odisha, India
