= Sora Sompeng (Unicode block) =

- Range: U+110D0..U+110FF (48 code points)
- Plane: SMP
- Scripts: Sora Sompeng
- Major alphabets: Sora
- Assigned: 35 code points
- Unused: 13 reserved code points

Unicode version history
- 6.1 (2012): 35 (+35)

Unicode documentation
- Code chart ∣ Web page

Sora Sompeng is a Unicode block containing characters for writing the Sora language of India.

Sora Sompeng^{[1]}^{[2]} Official Unicode Consortium code chart (PDF)
	0	1	2	3	4	5	6	7	8	9	A	B	C	D	E	F
U+110Dx	𑃐	𑃑	𑃒	𑃓	𑃔	𑃕	𑃖	𑃗	𑃘	𑃙	𑃚	𑃛	𑃜	𑃝	𑃞	𑃟
U+110Ex	𑃠	𑃡	𑃢	𑃣	𑃤	𑃥	𑃦	𑃧	𑃨							
U+110Fx	𑃰	𑃱	𑃲	𑃳	𑃴	𑃵	𑃶	𑃷	𑃸	𑃹						
Notes: 1. As of Unicode version 16.0; 2. Grey areas indicate non-assigned code points

== History ==
The following Unicode-related documents record the purpose and process of defining specific characters in the Sora Sompeng block:

Version	Final code points (Note: Proposed code points and characters names may differ from final code points and names)	Count	L2 ID	WG2 ID	Document
6.1	U+110D0..110E8, 110F0..110F9	35	L2/99-059	N1957	Everson, Michael (1999-01-29), Proposal for encoding the Sorang Sompeng script in the BMP of the UCS
6.1	U+110D0..110E8, 110F0..110F9	35	L2/08-129	N3410	Everson, Michael (2008-04-08), Preliminary proposal for encoding the Sorang Sompeng script in the UCS
6.1	U+110D0..110E8, 110F0..110F9	35	L2/09-104		Moore, Lisa (2009-05-20), "E.9", UTC #119 / L2 #216 Minutes
6.1	U+110D0..110E8, 110F0..110F9	35	L2/09-189R	N3647R	Everson, Michael (2009-06-08), Proposal for encoding the Sora Sompeng script in the UCS
6.1	U+110D0..110E8, 110F0..110F9	35		N3703 (pdf, doc)	Umamaheswaran, V. S. (2010-04-13), "M55.24", Unconfirmed minutes of WG 2 meeting no. 55, Tokyo 2009-10-26/30
6.1	U+110D0..110E8, 110F0..110F9	35	L2/10-174		Vitebsky, Piers (2010-05-06), Sora Sompeng text materials
