= Kharia language =

Munda language

Kharia
- खड़िया, ଖଡ଼ିଆ
- Region: India (Jharkhand, Chhattisgarh, Odisha).
- Ethnicity: Kharia
- Native speakers: 297,614; 69% of ethnic population (2011 census)
- Language family: Austroasiatic: Munda; South; Kharia
- Writing system: Devanagari, Odia, Latin

Official status
- Official language in: India: Jharkhand (additional)

Language codes
- ISO 639-3: khr
- Glottolog: khar1287
- ELP: Kharia

A multilingual person speaking Sadri, Kharia, and Sambalpuri language, recorded in China.

The Kharia language (Kharia pronunciation: [kʰaɽija] or [kʰeɽija]) is a Munda language of the Austroasiatic language family, that is primarily spoken by the Kharia people of eastern India.

== History ==
The first systematic description of the Kharia language is Banerjee (1894)'s Kharia grammar, followed by Tea Districts Labour Association (1929) and Floor et al. (1934), which resulted in a Kharia-English Dictionary. An ethnological study on the tribe was published in 1937 by Roy & Roy.

The first major academic approach to Kharia were taken by linguist Heinz-Jürgen Pinnow in the 1950s and 1960s with studies published in both German and English. Other works include Biligiri (1965)'s full study and lexicon; Mahapatra (1976) on Kharia and Juang verbs, Malhotra (1982) Ph.D. dissertation attempting a comprehensive grammar of Kharia; Abbi (1993; 1997) on language change and contact; Rehberg (2003) on Kharia phonology (in German).

== Classification ==
Kharia belongs to the Kharia–Juang branch of the Munda language family. Its closest extant relative is the Juang language, but the relationship between Kharia and Juang is remote.

Kharia is in contact with Sadri (the local lingua franca), Mundari, Kurukh, Hindi, and Odia (in Odisha).

== Distribution ==
Kharia speakers are located in the following districts of India.

- Jharkhand
  - Simdega district
  - Gumla district
- Odisha
  - Sundargarh district
  - Jharsuguda district

Kharia bidaai song

== Phonology ==
Kharia consonants
		Labial	Dental/ Alveolar	Retroflex	Post-alv./ Palatal	Velar	Glottal
Nasal		m	n	(ɳ)	ɲ	ŋ	
Stop/ Affricate	voiceless	p	t̪	ʈ	c	k	(ʔ)
Stop/ Affricate	aspirated		t̪ʰ	ʈʰ	cʰ	kʰ	
Stop/ Affricate	voiced	b	d̪	ɖ	ɟ	ɡ	
Stop/ Affricate	breathy		d̪ʱ	ɖʱ	ɟʱ	ɡʱ	
Stop/ Affricate	glottalised	ˀb		ˀɖ	ˀɟ		
Fricative	voiceless	f	s				
Fricative	voiced	v					ɦ
Approximant		w	l		j		
Tap	unaspirated		ɾ	(ɽ)			
Tap	aspirated			(ɽʱ)			

- [ɽ, ɽʱ] are only marginally phonemic and are normally intervocalic allophones of /ɖ, ɖʱ/.
- /f/ came from earlier */pʰ/ and can also be pronounced among some speakers as an affricate [p͡f], which was most likely an intermediate stage between the /pʰ > f/ shift.
- /v/ came from earlier */bʱ/ and can also be pronounced among some speakers as an affricate [b͡v], which was most likely an intermediate stage between the /bʱ > v/ shift.
- /c, cʰ, ɟ, ɟʱ/ are often realized as affricate sounds [t͡ʃ, t͡ʃʰ, d͡ʒ, d͡ʒʱ], especially in loanwords.
- [ʔ] is an allophone of /ɡ/ when in coda position.

Kharia vowels
	Front	Central	Back
Close	i		u
Mid	e	(ə)	o
Open		a	
Diphthong	/ae̯, ao̯, ou̯, oe̯, ui̯/		

- /i, e, o, u/ have lax allophones of [ɪ, ɛ, ɔ, ʊ].
- /a/ can have allophones of [ɑ, ä, ə, ʌ].

Gemination only occur in morpheme boundaries of words. Consonant length can be phonemic. E.g. /oton=na/ realized as [ɔtɔnːɑ] (press=INF). /ʔ/, /s/, and /h/ may not be geminated.

== Morphosyntax ==
=== Parts of speech in Kharia ===
==== Issues with parts of speech in Kharia ====
In most languages, there are basic rules and distinctions among lexical categories such as nouns and verbs. Nouns, the central nucleus of noun phrases, primarily serve referential functions, whereas verbs function predicatively. In some languages, however, lexical items are not inherently specified for such functions. When a lexeme can flexibly function referentially, predicatively, or attributively without derivation, and fails to be lexically specified morphosyntactically, it is known as precategoriality. Languages in which the majority of the lexicon or the majority of complex syntactic are precategorial are therefore called precategorial languages. Unlike English, where derivational processes are highly productive (such as the verbalizer -ify), and predication typically requires copulae (i.e., to be) or auxiliary verb constructions, precategorial languages do not rely on these mechanisms, as underived lexemes can directly assume referential, predicative, or attributive functions without category-changing morphology.

There is little if any structural evidence in Kharia to support the existence of a noun–verb–adjective distinction in (Simdega) Kharia. It seems that the Kharia lemmas' functional distribution is organized by syntactic configuration rather than inherent lexical property. The information carried by the lemma does not determine its inherent syntactical and lexical category. Virtually all roots, from basic monosyllabic lexemes, derived words, to complex phrases, regardless of potential meanings and functions and discourse choices, can all freely serve as semantic heads in either a predicate or its complements (arguments and modifiers) with compositional results. There are no morphological distinctions between these uses.

"Generic nouns":

lebu ɖel=ki
man come=MID.PST
'The/A man came.'

Bhagwan lebu=ki ro ɖel=ki
God man=MID.PST and come=MID.PST
'God became man (Jesus) and came (to earth).'

ho=kaɽ=te iɲ=aʔ natgoth=oˀj
that=SG.HUM=OBL I=GEN family.relationship=ACT.PST.1SG
'I accepted him/her as a member of my family'

Wh-interrogatives:

gam=e=pe i=ye=niŋ?
say=ACT.IRR=2PL what=ACT.IRR=1PL.INCL
'Tell me, what shall we (do)?'

Indefinites:

jahã guɽuʔ=may[...]
INDEF OPT=3PL
'Let them (do) whatever[...]'

Quantifiers:

jhaɽi daru biru oɖoʔ moɲ goɖ=ki=may
all tree mountain other one CTEL=MID.PST=3PL
'All trees and mountains and everything else(other) became one.'

Property modifiers:

konon=na=ba
small=MID.IRR=2SG.HON
'Become small/Make yourself small!'

Proper names:

aʔghrom=ki
Aghrom=MID.PST
'It came to be called(became) Aghrom' (Literally 'It Aghromed.')

aʔghrom=oʔ
Aghrom=ACT.PST
'Someone named it Aghrom' (Literally 'Someone Aghromed it.')

Status and roles:

ho=kaɽ ayo=ki
that=SG.HUM mother=MID.PST
'She became mother.' (Literally 'That person mothered.')

ho=kaɽ=te ayo=yoˀj
that=SG.HUM=OBL 'mother=ACT.PST.1SG
'I accepted her as mother.' (Literally 'I mothered that person.')

Deictic "adverbials" and proforms:

musa iɖaʔ=ki
today yesterday=MID.PST
'Today became yesterday' (Literally 'Today yesterday-ed.')

ho rochoˀb=ki=ɲ
that side=MID.PST=1SG
'I moved to that side.' (Literally 'I that-side-ed.')

am=ga am=na=m
You=FOC You=MID.IRR=2SG
'Thou will be thou (Literally You beyou will).'

"NP" with genitive:

am ho=kaɽ=te am=aʔ=yoˀb
You 3=SG.HUM=OBL you=GEN=ACT.PST.2SG
'You adopted him/her (Literally You made him/her yours)'

Genitive attribute in "NP":

Bharat=yaʔ lebu=ki bides=aʔ lebu=ki=yaʔ rupraŋ=ki=may
India=GEN person=PL aboard=GEN person=PL=GEN appearance=MID.PST=3PL
'The Indians took on the appearance of foreigners (e.g. by living abroad so long).'

What listed above are quite deviated far away from the generally conceivable concepts of "noun" or "nominal", which are usually known as a lexical or syntactical category prototypically associated with the semantic category of thing, and "verb" or "predicative", which are usually known as a lexical or syntactical category prototypically associated with the semantic category of action. Of course, one from general prescriptivist linguistics could assume that (Simdega) Kharia's case is similar to English's zero-derivation/conversion strategy, which shifts word categories through verbalization and deverbalization without morphological change, and thus asserts that Kharia must have lexical categories in the sense of mainstream Indo-European-based linguistic frameworks as well. However, as examples from the corpus show that even complex NP-like structures like "appearance of aboard people" and proper names like Aghrom can appear as content heads of predicative phrases with compositional semantic results, suggesting that Kharia does not "use nouns as verbs" or "use verbs as nouns", or "there is a hidden verb"/"hidden copula", but its lexicon neither fits into the mainstream pedagogical understanding of lexical classes. Rather, the overarching prescriptivist view that all languages share the same underlying structures has never provided a satisfactory and exhaustive structural explanation for Kharia. Furthermore, the next section provides additional evidence for why derivations in Kharia do not create new stable word classes or assign different lexical category to derived forms.

==== Derivations ====
===== Lexical juxtapositions =====
In Kharia, lexical juxtapositions are constructions formed by arranging two (or more) contentive morphemes side by side without morphological bonding, but result in a single semantic unit. Their meanings are often compositional or loosely associative, e.g., combinations such as "forest + scrubland" meaning 'wilderness' or "field + farm" creating 'farmland', depending on interpretation. Although collectively showing a subtle semantic outcome, the two contentive morphemes do not constitute a single prosodic and morphological word. Furthermore, the juxtaposed contentive morphemes can be easily separated by a clitic or another word.

Lexical juxtapositions	Word-by-word meaning	New meaning
ompay khirom	big.river + river	'rivers'
kheti baɽi	field + farm	'farms'
kinir jhaŋkoy	forest + scrubland	'forest, wilderness'
goˀjlo[ʔ] aŋkel	field + land	'cultivated land'
baʔ rumkhuˀb	paddy + rice	'grain'
paisa ɖhebuwa	money (Indo-Aryan) + money (Kharia)	'wealth'
usloʔ tirib	earth + cloud	'universe'
tiʔ kaʈa	hand + leg	'body parts'
kulam kulamɖay	brother + sister	'people'
oreˀj koŋtaŋ	bull + cow	'cattle'

===== True compounds =====
Due to bimoraic constraint, Kharia, like most Munda languages, requires phonological words to be at least bisyllabic, with very few exceptions. Thus, virtually all standalone contentive morphemes consist of at least two syllables. True compounds (like the one listed below) in Kharia are actual phonological words with single coherent prosodic profiles. They are typically formed from two concatenated morphemes, one of which is the monosyllabic lexical core of a contentive morpheme. This lexical core is phonologically dependent and cannot occur in free isolation.

Kharia compound
	Compounds	Morpheme-by-morpheme meaning	New meaning
Structurally considered compounds	baʔ-loʔ	paddy-land (< usloʔ 'land')	'paddy'
Structurally considered compounds	jaʔ-loʔ	grass-land	'meadow'
Structurally considered compounds	dhuɽi-loʔ	dust-land	'desert'
Structurally considered compounds	kunɽu[ʔ]-siŋ	child-fowl (< siŋkoy 'chicken')	'chick'
Structurally considered compounds	si-loʔ	plow-land	'plow'
Structurally considered compounds	paʔ-sor	break-stone (< soreŋ 'stone')	'grinding slab'
Structurally considered compounds	muʔ-ɖaʔ	emerge-water	'source, origin(ate)'
Structurally considered compounds	soʔ-lui	tie-hair (< ului 'hair')	'tie up a girl's hair; girl's hair'
Structurally considered compounds	ur-boʔ	shake-head (< bokoˀb 'head')	'shake the head'
Structurally considered compounds	iˀj-thaŋ	shit-cow	'(cow) dung'
Semantically unpredictable compounds	diyom-jaŋ	lamp-bone	'knee bone' (lit. 'lamp-shaped bone')
Semantically unpredictable compounds	goŋɽiŋ-oʔ	cook-house	'kitchen'
Semantically unpredictable compounds	kaɖoŋ-moˀɖ	fish-eye	'name of a tree (whose leaves are shaped like fish eyes)'
Semantically unpredictable compounds	borol-ɖaʔ	live-water	'fresh water'

===== Pseudo-compounds and "noun incorporation" =====
In Kharia, pseudo-compounding (which may be referred to as "incorporation") of semantic bases and adjuncts has been fossilized and mostly limited to certain stems and to lexicalized (non-productive) forms. Polysyllabic contentive words are reduced to their final syllable(s), while no phonological adjustments occur on monosyllabic items. The incorporated compounds may result in idiosyncratic semantics.

There are two main types of these constructions: historical and pseudo-compounds. Neither of these types is immune to precategoriality as they remain contentive and fully opaque to syntax, although they tend to occur in predicative function. The internal structure of historical compounds may reveal an earlier stage of Kharia, when the language may still have retained an S-V-O structure and had distinct lexical categories of verbs and nouns inherited from its ancestral Proto-Austroasiatic predecessor.

The "pseudo-compounds" and semi-productive incorporation contentives (4, 5 and 6) originated from a later stage of the language. Additionally, there are few forms (7) that were derived from incorporations whose "verbal" components no longer exists as contentive morphemes.

Historical:

1. guˀj 'wash' + tiʔ 'hand' = guʔthe, guʔʈhe 'wash hand'

2. boŋ 'finish' + sor (< soreŋ ('stone')) = boŋsor 'petrify'

3. muʔ 'emerge, come out' + siŋ (< siŋkom 'star') = muʔsiŋ '(the sun) to rise'

Pseudo-compounds:

4. ajoˀɖ 'dry' + ɖaʔ 'water' = ajoˀɖ ɖaʔ 'dry up'

ɖaʔ ajoˀɖ ɖaʔ=ki
water dry water=MID.PST
'The water dried up.'

5. betoˀɖ 'become hungry' + ɖaʔ 'water' = betoˀɖ ɖaʔ 'become thirsty'

Semi-productive incorporation:

6. ulaʔ 'letter' + likha 'write' = ulaʔ likha 'write letter'

kol ulaʔ likha=ki=kiyar
RECP letter write=MID.PST=DU
'They wrote each other letters.' (accepted by some speakers. Preferred form ulaʔ kol likha=ki=kiyar).

Incorporation with lost "verbal" component:

7. kul-ɖaʔ 'get/have a fever' < *kul ? ɖaʔ 'water'

From a historical linguistic perspective, pseudo-compounds were likely derived later, imitative of historic compounds, thereby mimicking their internal syntactic structure. The semi-incorporations were likely created more recently, as evidenced by their OV order and limited usage (accompanied with the reciprocal marker kol). Still, the pseudo-compounds and semi-incorporations are merely juxtaposed contentive morphemes and do not share the properties of a compound, that is, a single structurally integrated phonological and syntactic unit. A floating clitic can be freely inserted between two components of pseudo-compounds. Such frequent quirks invalidate their phono-morphological status as compounds.

ɖaʔ ajoˀɖ=ga ɖaʔ=ki
water dry=FOC water=MID.PST
'The water dried up.'

urum=ga ɖaʔ=ki
warm=FOC water=MID.PST
'S/he sweated.'

On the other hand, enclitic markers cannot be inserted between two elements in historical compounds. The elements of these forms are tightly bonded syntactically and thus are justifiably considered as single monolithic phonological units.

boŋ-sor=ki
finish-stone=MID.PST
'It petrified.'

ol-ɖay=oʔ
take-woman=ACT.PST
'He married.'

===== Overt prefixing and infixing derivation =====
Austroasiatic languages are characterized by rich and historically productive systems of derivation, especially through prefixation and infixation. In many branches of the family, particularly in Mainland Southeast Asia, these derivational processes are associated with lexical recategorization (i.e. nominalization, verbalization), producing forms that fall into fixed syntactic categories of nouns, verbs, or other parts of speech.

In Kharia, although cognate derivational morphology is formally present, its functional outcome is significantly different. It also hardly resembles that of the Mon-Khmer derivation. Lexemes created through prefixation or infixation, e.g., with the nasal infix -n- or causative prefixes -(o)(ʔ)b- produce a new lexical concept from another, somewhat related in semantics but unpredictable. However, these affixes do not assign nor change the syntactic category of the derived lexemes. Derived lexemes may denote instruments, locations, events, or causative relations, but they remain distributionally flexible and may occur as semantic heads in referential, predicative, or attributive functions.

Underived contentive morphemes	Meaning	Derived contentive morphemes	Meaning
joʔ	'sweep'	jo-n-oʔ	'broom'
bel	'spread out'	be-n-el	'bedding'
muʔsiŋ	'rise'	mu-n-uʔsiŋ	'east'
jin	'touch'	ji-n-ib	'touch'
bui	'raise, keep'	bu-n-ui	'pig'
rab	'bury'	ra-n-ab	'burial ground'
roʔ	'drop, spill'	ro-n-oʔ	'droping/spilling'
tol	'tie'	to-n-ol	'string, toe face'
*sel	'pray'	se-n-el	'prayer'
gil	'beat'	gi-n-il	'beating'
uʔfe	'three'	uʔ-n-fe	'three each'

Due to pragmatic factors, it is nearly impossible to observe derived morphemes such as bunui 'pig' functioning as predicates in everyday discourse. However, Simdega Kharia speakers do not perceive using derived contentive morphemes in flexible constructions as illgrammatical, showing that the flexible construction is still structurally legitimate. Thus, bunui may have the predicative meaning "to become a pig" in middle voice, and "to make someone/something a pig" in active voice, while in referential function, it simply means "a/the pig" (cf. ginil 'beating, beat (habitually)). In summary, except for a small, closed class of proforms and deictics of time and place, there is no syntactic difference between the underived and derived forms as they both remain precategorial. Thus, the affixes in Kharia do not display any characteristics of "nominalizers" or "adjectivizers" nor "verbalizers.".

===== Echo-words =====
Echo words in Kharia are formed through partial reduplication, in which the second element mirrors the phonological structure of the first with systematic variation. These constructions typically express something resembles English "etc.". E.g. main marjad 'honour, etc.', kado walo 'mud, etc.'

Echo-formation does not assign lexical category status. The resulting form remains a contentive unit and may serve as the semantic head of predicative construction, either a partially finite or fully finite. The echo-word may be separated from the lexical head by variously morphemes when it is used as an imperfective converb, evidently suggesting that echo formations are not compounds.

musniŋ ho=ki jhaɽi kuruʔ hakon=ki=te somtay=oʔ=ki ro kuda no kudi raylogaɽh tay yar kan=oʔ=ki
one.day that=PL all child ECHO=PL=OBL collect=ACT.PST=PL and hurry CMPL ECHO Railogarh ABL flee CONT=ACT.PST=PL
'One day they gathered up all the children and fled quickly (hurrying) from Railogarh.'

==== Defining Kharia lexical categories ====
To summarize, the Kharia lexemes show equally distributional and semantic regularity, stable and compositional, across syntactic functions—under parametrical and structural analysis—and no consistent set of ontological, semantic, syntactic, or discourse-pragmatic criteria supports evidence that any verb-noun distinction exists. Henceforth, John Peterson (2011) concludes that traditional lexical categories such as verbs and nouns are formally absent in Kharia. Instead, according to his analysis, the Kharia lexicon is divided into two principal classes:

The contentive morphemes form an open class of semantically full elements that carry lexical meaning. They are inherently underspecified for grammatical category and can occur as the SEMANTIC/CONTENT HEAD in referential, predicative, or attributive function. The syntactic and morphological environment determines their role within the clause. When a contentive morpheme is marked with TAM/PERSON enclitics, it functions predicatively. Its combination with case and number enclitics produces a referential interpretation.

The functional morphemes and proforms/deictics form a closed class of functional elements that mark grammatical functions and also signal the syntagma's syntactic role. They include enclitic markers for case, number, tense–aspect–mood, person, honorific status, and various discourse functions. Functional morphemes cannot occur independently and do not contribute lexical meaning. They attach phonologically and syntactically to the contentive morphemes or clauses, forming the FUNCTION HEADS of Case-Syntagmas and TAM/PERSON-Syntagmas. Their attachments determine the syntactic and morphological properties of the clause, defining grammatical relations and predicate structure.

==== Differences in perceptions over parts of speech in Kharia dialects ====
Location of Simdega district of Jharkhand. Speakers of the Simdega dialect generally accept flexible constructions.

Location of Gumla district. Speakers of the Gumla Kharia dialect tend not to tolerate flexible constructions.

The Kharia lexicon shows dialect-specific variation in how speakers conceptualize lexical organization, in particular regarding distinction between lexical categories. The investigation conducted by Peterson found that, although the two main varieties of Kharia share the same morphosyntactic structures, the degree of lexical flexibility varies between them.

In the Simdega dialect, lexical items fall into an open class of contentive morphemes and a closed class of proforms/deictics and functional markers. No independent noun-verb distinction is evident, and categorization is determined by syntactic configurations. Any contentive morpheme, including reduplicated masdars, may serve freely in referential, predicative, or attributive roles.

The Gumla dialect presents clearer evidence for a noun-verb distinction. Speakers generally do not accept predicative uses of lexical items referring to physical or animate entities without a light verb. They avoid complex predicates built from nominal expressions. Still, many contentives remain lexically underspecified, and both dialects share the same structural units—Case-Syntagmas and TAM/person-Syntagmas. Dialectal differences may emerge primarily in the acceptability and complexity of potential semantic heads.

Another factor concerning legal acceptability is age. Documentation interviews found that, among adult male and younger Simdega Kharia speakers, many of whom are school students, the acceptability rate is always 100%. Older adults (especially women) and elderly speakers who more strictly adhere to the "pure" or "classical" Kharia (Sudh Kharia) tend to reject those constructions. However, Classical Kharia is a variety of traditional written Kharia found in old literature, it is not spoken, and it is highly influenced by Hindi and Sadri. Moreover, earlier texts collected by Pinnow (1965) and Kerketta (1990) show that these disputed constructions did in fact occur in spontaneous and literary Kharia, suggesting that the flexible interpretation of Kharia is structurally legitimate for both the spoken and literary forms of the language. Sociolinguistic factors, prescriptivist attitudes, and language contact may reinforce the idea that views flexible constructions as "inelegant" and thus many adult speakers tend to avoid.

The core Kharia-speaking area of the Simdega district overlaps with the North Munda (Mundari) zone. The language has been in prolonged contact with Mundari, having undergone areal convergence with North Munda and Sadri. Today, Kharia exhibits significant influence from Mundari morphosyntax and lexicon, especially regarding the parts of speech, with respect to precategoriality. North Munda, especially Kherwarian lects of Jharkhand, typically show virtually absence of evidence for lexical categories such as nouns, verbs, adjectives. South Munda languages, however, at least tend to distinguish nouns and verbs, except Kharia, so the only South Munda language in Jharkhand. Conversely, the northern and southern peripheral Kharia dialects display lesser lexical flexibility. In terms of this kind of extreme lexical flexibility, Simdega Kharia is undoubtedly unique within its subgroup.

=== Case-Syntagmas ("Noun phrases") ===
The Case-Syntagma is a morphosyntactic structure consists of a semantic head and a functional head which is composed of case and number enclitics. The semantic head can be a single contentive morpheme or a more complex phrasal unit, including genitive-marked constructions. The function head includes case, possessive, and number markers attached to the rightmost element of the syntagma, governing the Case-Syntagma's grammatical information independently of the content head's lexical meanings.

The Case-Syntagma covers functions typically associated with arguments, possessors, and modifiers. It contains reference and nominal relations, but differs fundamentally in that it is not anchored in a lexically defined "noun" category. Its nominal behavior is solely provided by the functional morpheme clitics. It is broadly comparable to a noun phrase in English.

A schematic overview of the Case-Syntagma Structure in Kharia:

GEN-ATTR DET DEM QUANT=CLF GEN-ATTR DET Lexeme(s)=POSS=NUM/HON=GEN=CASE

==== Pronouns ====
		Singular	Dual	Plural
1st person	exclusive	iɲ/iŋ (less common)	iɲjar	ele
1st person	inclusive	iɲ/iŋ (less common)	anaŋ	aniŋ
2nd person		am	ambar	ampe
3rd person	Anaphoric	aɖi	aɖ(i)kiyar	aɖiki
3rd person	unmarked	hokaɽ, hojeʔ ukaɽ, ujeʔ hinkaɽ, hinjeʔ hankaɽ, hanjeʔ	hokiyar ukiyar hinkiyar hankiyar	hoki uki hinki hanki

==== Case ====
Kharia Case-Syntagma has three cases:

- Nominative: unmarked
- Oblique: =te
- Genitive: =aʔ

The oblique case marker =te denotes a distinction between core and peripheral arguments. Participants marked with =te are interpreted as structurally and semantically external, in contrast to the nominative unmarked arguments. Thus, a Case-Syntagma marked with an oblique case marker is effectively blocked from forming part of the content head of a TAM/Person-Syntagma.

sahar=te=ki=ɲ
city=OBL=MID.PST=1SG
*Not applicable

The genitive marker =aʔ in Kharia does not mark the relationship of a Case-Syntagma to other syntagmas, such as a TAM/Person-Syntagma or another Case-Syntagma. Instead, it signals that the marked semantic base may function as part of a larger semantic head or that a certain postposition selects a semantic head in the genitive.

oʔ=yaʔ teloŋ
house=GEN roof
'the roof of the house'

og=aʔ bahare
house=GEN outside
'outside of the house'

Usually, the two cases do not co-occur on the same Case-Syntagma. However, it is possible for both to appear in the same Case-Syntagma for certain restricted contexts. Peterson notes that when the lexical head is not overtly mentioned due to its identity is already recoverable from the context or is considered unimportant, the oblique =te will attach to it, regardless of its grammatical status, which in some cases is a genitive determiner. This happens in two constructions: predicative alienable possession and locative meaning 'at the home/place of'.

iɲ=aʔ=te saykal ayiˀj
me=GEN=OBL bicycle QUAL.PRES
'I have a bicycle.'

==== Adpositions ====
Kharia has many postpositions but only one preposition: enem 'without'. The following tables show several types of postpositional elements found in the language. Postpositions of Indo-Aryan origin are noted with (IA).

Simple postpositions
	Meanings
buŋ	'with'
ghaˀɖ	'for'
lekhe (IA)	'like, similar to'
loʔɖho	'after'
motabik (IA)	'according to'
tay	ABL
seŋ	'before'
thom, thoŋ	'for'
jou, jaw	'up to, as far as, until'

Complex postpositions
	Meanings
badte	'after' (IA)
bahar(=te)	'outside of' (IA)
bhitare(=te)	'within' (IA)
kunɖaˀb(=te)	'behind'
moʔjhi(=te)	'amidst, among' (IA)
mugam(=te)	'in front of'
tobluŋ(=te)	'on top of, above'
tuta(=te)	'under, below'
boʔtay, khoʔtay, khoʔte	'up to, until, as far as'

Postpositions from converbs & adjuncts
	Meanings
hoy=kon	'via, by way of'
melay=kon	'other than, except for'
dhoʔ=kon	'with'
boʔte	'at the place (of)'
hinte	'at; in; on'
tiˀj	'side; direction'

==== Gender ====
Grammatical gender is not a morphosyntactical feature of Kharia, but the language has independent words to identify whether a male or female of a lexical word is intended. E.g. kokro siŋkoy 'rooster' and kitur siŋkoy 'hen'.

==== Person ====
Inalienable content heads are cross-referenced with possessive markers shown in the table below.

		Singular	Dual	Plural
1st person	exclusive	=ɲ/iɲ/(i)ŋ	=jar	=le
1st person	inclusive	=ɲ/iɲ/(i)ŋ	=naŋ	=niŋ
2nd person		=nom	=bar	=pe
3rd person		=ɖom	=ɖom=kiyar	=ɖom=ki

==== Interrogatives ====
	Interrogatives
ata	'what?, which?'
atu	'where?'
ber, behar	'who?'
i	'what?'
ina	'why?'
kiʔte, kiˀjte	'how many?'
a-	Question marker

==== Numerals ====
Kharia has two numeral systems. The one native to Kharia is no longer in common productive use, therefore having great disparities and disagreements. The other, which was borrowed from Sadri, is used in daily life.

	native numerals	borrowed from Sadri
0		sun
1	moɲ (NHUM), muɖu (HUM)	ek
2	ubar	dui
3	ufeʔ	tin
4	ifonʔ, tham	cair, ceir
5	moloy, thum	pãc
6	tibru, tibhru, ʈibru	chaw
7	ghul, tham, thom, thoŋ	sat
8	tham, thom, thomsiŋ, ghul	aʈh
9	thomsiŋ, tomsiŋ, ghal, ghul	naw, nãw
10	gʰol	das
100	moloy ekɽi	say, saw, sos
1000		hajar

The Sadri derived numerals often go with numeral classifiers. Classifiers occur very seldom with native numerals, at least by modern speakers, perhaps due to the unfamiliarity of the modern speakers with the Kharia numerals.

Kharia classifiers
Classifier	Note
cepuʔ	'handful'
gaɽ	possibly derived from kaɽ 'human'
go	Not attested by Peterson
jan/jhan	used with human entities
mene	multifunctional
=o	general classifier, clitic
ʈaŋ/ʈhaŋ/ʈhoŋ	similar to ʈho
ʈho	generally non-human entities

Except mene and gaɽ, the mentioned classifiers of Kharia are well in line with the classifier systems of neighboring Eastern Indo-Aryan languages (notably Sardi), with cognate forms suggesting they were borrowed from Indo-Aryan. The use of classifiers in Kharia is optional, however. They often stand with cardinal numerals, and rarely, with quantifiers.

For the case of mene, Peterson describes: "mene is the most elusive of the classifiers, and in fact, its status as a classifier is questionable." Mene can occur with not only different quantifiers but also any type of lexical heads. It may be found occurring with demonstratives, a genitive attributive, or even an adverbial. While its true function is still unknown, Peterson tentatively considers it a classifier.

==== Modifiers ("Adjectives") ====
From a morphosyntactic perspective, any contentive morpheme can function attributively to express the change of state (with middle voice) or a transitive telic action (with active voice). Thus, there is no evidence to assume a separate lexical class of "adjectives" in Kharia.

In attributive role, modifiers ("adjective") usually take the shapes of masdars or polysyllabic contentive morphemes. Due to bimoraic constraint, monosyllabic contentive morphemes are required to form masdars in order to participate in attributive functions. The process is purely phonologically motivated and does not derived new stable lexical classes. The modifier is simply juxtaposed before the contentive morpheme that it modifies.

Contentive morpheme	Masdar	Example
saŋ 'become yellow'	saŋ-saŋ	
ruʔ 'open'	ruʔ-ruʔ	ruʔ-ruʔ kaˀbʈo 'open door'
rusuŋ 'red'	rusuŋ	rusuŋ oʔ 'red house'
maha 'large'	maha	maha daru 'big tree'
konon 'become small'	konon	konon bhai 'little brother'
ɖoko 'sit down; settle'	ɖoko	ɖoko ʈhãɽo 'settled place'
botoŋ 'become afraid'	botoŋ	botoŋ lebu 'frightened person'

On the other hand, there are few monosyllabic contentive morphemes of mostly Indo-Aryan origin never reduplicate with an exception of col 'to go'. E.g. bes '(become) good', bes dinu 'good day'.

=== TAM/Person-Syntagmas ("Verbs") ===
Kharia lacks lexical categories of nouns and verbs, so any semantic bases/contentive morphemes, and even a whole complex Case-Syntagma structure corresponding to the ordinary "noun phrase" can function as the head in the predicative role within a syntactic phrase. In assembly with other functional morphemes, they form a TAM/Person-Syntagma, the predicative syntactic unit of a sentence. There are two major types of predicates in Kharia: narrative predication, which may resemble the typical predication in most languages, and equational predication (approximately "be" construction). The latter subtype consists of non-inherent qualitative predication and qualitative predication, both of which share the same structure as the narrative predicates except in the present tense. The qualitative predicative marker may also not be present, or "lacking", resulting in what resembles a "nominal sentence" but with subtle semantic differences to examples in which an element translating as 'be' or 'become' is present.

The simplified maximal structure of a non-periphrastic, fully finite narrative TAM/Person-Syntagma in Kharia:

RECP CAUS-Lexeme/CAUS/ v2=PERF=TAM/VOICE=PERS/NUM/HON

The maximal structure of a fully finite, non-negative, non-periphrastic TAM/Person-Syntagma can be described as follows:

RECP CAUS-Lexeme/CAUS/ EXCESS BEN CONT/ITER/SITER PASS/REFL AUTOPOES TEL=PERF=TAM/VOICE=PERS/NUM/HON

That is, the content head of the syntagma can be a contentive morpheme or a complex Case-Syntagma structure, potentially modified by a causative prefix or infix. Following and supporting the semantic head is the functional head, containing a series of explicator verbs or "v2", although their status as phonological words is somewhat unclear with respect to intonation, and many of them do not seem to carry any lexical meanings other than to mark voice, aspects, aktionsart, and orientation to the TAM/Person-Syntagma. Functional morphemes such as TAM and Person/Number/Honorific are marked by enclitics attached to the rightmost element of the function head.

==== Types of Semantic bases in TAM/Person-Syntagmas ====
The most common type of semantic head of a finite TAM/Person Syntagma is a simple, non-derived contentive morpheme:

gam=te=ki
talk=ACT.PRES=3PL
'They say'

A monosyllabic contentive morpheme can reduplicate to derive a masdar. The masdar TAM/Person-syntagma is used to denote various tenuous forms of TAM-aktionsart, such as remote past, habitual, or an event that took longer than usual. Masdars can only take the middle TAM markers.

lam~lam=ki
RDPL~search=MID.PST
'S/he looked for [it] for a long time.' (Accepted in Simdega Kharia, rejected in Gumla Kharia)

A profound problem with the active-middle opposition that is fused in TAM categories is that it does not simply represent a distinction between transitive and intransitive predicates, nor do they restrictively function in transitivity marking. Peterson notes that the distribution of active-middle contrasts may also be indicated semantically. For example, the following contentive morphemes never occur in active predicates, since their semantics are inherently middle, which do not signify whether an additional semantic participant is involved, and the action is avolitional or eventive.

- aw 'live, stay'
- goˀj 'die'
- ajoˀɖ 'dry up (in a well)'
- gur 'fall'
- hoy 'become'

While many contentive morphemes are compatible with both the active and the middle voice with a contrast in interpretation, which Peterson describes as different functions, some contentive morphemes of a particular semantic categories can only are restricted to only one voice depending on their prototypical meanings, which Peterson calls inherent functions.

Peterson identifies several semantic tendencies in contentive morphemes that permits different functions. The middle is associated with intransitivity, spontaneous changes of state, durative processes and reduced volitionality. The active is associated with transitivity, externally directed action and potential volitional control. They are not all equally productive: some are widespread, whereas others are restricted to a small number of contentives or vary between speakers.

Differential functions of Middle and Active
Tendency	Middle	Active
Transitivity	Intransitive	Transitive
Aspectual	GENERIC = atelic, habitual, long duration, remote past, remote, indefinite future	Unmarked, telic
Direction	Self-directed	Outwardly directed
Thoroughness	Non-thorough	Thorough
Volitionary	Avolitional	Volitional
Punctuality	Non-punctual	Punctual
Action	(No action, SG)/(Long duration, DU/PL)	(action, SG)/(Shorter duration, DU/PL)
Concerning object	(Non-individuated object)	(Individuated object)
Stage of achievement	(Thwarted attempt)	(Successful action)
Participation	(Indirect participation)	(Direct participation)

A significant number of Kharia contentive morphemes that might have originated from Sadri/Indo-Aryan employ augmentation to distinguish the middle and active contrasts.

Contentive morphemes with different forms in Middle and Active
Middle	Meaning	Active	Meaning
bagɽe	'spoil' (INTR)	bagɽay	'spoil' (TR), 'ruin'
cale	'function', 'go'	calay	'drive' (a car, etc.)
chuʔʈe	'leave' (INTR)	chuʔʈay	'leave' (TR)
khole	'open' (INTR)	kholay	'open' (TR)
ʈhane	'try unsuccessfully to assert'	ʈhanay	'assert'

Consequently, the lexical distribution of contentive morphemes that permit only one semantically assigned function (i.e., inherent function), whether middle-only or active-only, such as those shown above (aw, goˀj, ajoˀɖ, gur, hoy,...etc) also exhibit a semantic distinction between middle and active, which is typically driven by similar tendencies such as transitivity, volitionary, and eventiveness. Inherently intransitive contentive morphemes that describe body-actions can be active-only if they are potentially controllable, such as khuʔ 'cough', hãʔchiŋ 'sneeze', iʔchõy ('fart'). The table below summarizes the inherent functions:

Inherent functions of the Middle and Active
Tendency	Middle	Active
Transitivity	Intransitive	Transitive
Aspectual	Inherently long duration/Change of state	Unmarked
Volitionary	Avolitional	Potentially volitional

==== Subject marking ====
Similar to Remo, Gutob, Gtaʔ, and recently Juang, Kharia predicate only marks person/number of the subject argument. Distinction between animate and inanimate agents is not so profound in Kharia as they are both marked, although Biligiri (1965) stated that "there is a stronger tendency to observe number agreement with an animate subject than with an inanimate subject."

		singular	dual (HON)	plural
1st person	exclusive	=ɲ(iɲ)/=ŋ(iŋ)	=jar	=le
1st person	inclusive	=ɲ(iɲ)/=ŋ(iŋ)	=naŋ	=niŋ
2nd person		=(e)m	=bar	=pe
3rd person		=Ø	=kiyar	=ki/=may

==== Tense, aspect, mood ====
Kharia, like many Munda languages, merges TAM categories with active and middle voices.

	Middle	Active
Present	=ta	=te
Present Progressive	=taˀjɖ	=teˀjɖ
Past Neutral (Past I)	=ki	=(y)oʔ
Irrealis	=na	=e
Past II	=khoʔ	
Perfect	=siʔ(ɖ)	
Optative	guɽuʔ/guɖuʔ	

==== Causative ====
The causative derivation increases the valency of a contentive morpheme by introducing a higher or superordinate agent who causes the lower agent to act or a non-agentive event to happen. In Kharia, the signature marker of the Austroasiatic family -(o)(ʔ)b- (including allomorphs) is used as the causative prefix or infix. Double causative constructions are also allowed.

root	gloss	Simple causative	meaning	Double causative	meaning
aloŋ	'sing'	a-ˀb-loŋ	'have someone sing'	ob-a-ˀb-loŋ	'someone make someone sing'
ɖeˀb	'rise, climb'	o-ɖeˀb	'raise, offer up, sacrifice'	oˀb-ɖeˀb	'have someone sacrifice'
lemeˀɖ	'go to bed'	le-ʔ-meˀɖ	'put someone to bed'	oˀb-le-ʔ-meˀɖ	'have someone put someone to bed'
sore	'become ready'	so-ˀb-re	'prepare'	ob-so-ˀb-re	'have someone prepare'

==== Passive ====
The passive voice/reflexive in Kharia is realized as a standalone word ɖom, itself has no lexical meaning. Historically, it might have stemmed from the contentive morpheme dʒom ('to eat'), as it appears to cognate with Santali passive -jɔn (< jɔm 'to eat') and Sora-Juray reflexive/low transitive denoting marker -dəm-.

pothi=ki ter ɖom=ki=may
book=PL give PASS=MID.PST=3PL
'(The) Books were given.'

==== Reciprocal ====
The Munda reciprocal *kƏl/*qəl is manifested in Kharia as a free-standing word kol, which has no lexical meaning. Whereas in other South Munda languages the reflexes of *kƏl exist as derivational prefixes and are used to derive new lexical verbs, the reciprocal marker in Kharia does not morphologically derive new words and does not directly change the meaning of the contentive morpheme of a TAM/Person-syntagma. In many cases, the interpretation of kol is broadly reciprocal, as illustrated:

ho=kiyar pothi=te kol lusu=ki=kiyar
that=DU book=OBL RECP grab=MID.PST=DU
'They grabbed each other book.'

In other contexts, it denotes what Lichtenberk (1985) described as collective, i.e. two participants did something together.

kol aloŋ=ki=kiyar
RECP sing=MID.PST=DU
'They sang together.'

Lichtenberk also mentioned the third interpretation of the reciprocal is situation chaining, exemplified by the following sentence:

kol buliˀj=taˀj=kiyar
RECP follow=MID.PST=DU
'They followed each other.'

==== V2s ("Explicator verbs") ====
===== Telicity =====
There are two telic markers in Kharia which serve the narrative structure:

- ɖoˀɖ (allomorph ɖoɽ) indicates that another event follows directly upon the event denoted by the predicate that it marks;

Tay raja jhaɽi mudh kalo=ki=te ro yahudi jait=aʔ etoŋɖag=aʔ guru=ki=te ɖokloʔ remaʔ ɖoʈh=oʔ ro ho=ki=te "masih=te ate jorme=na ayiˀj?" gam=oʔ ro juŋ=oʔ
then king all chief priest=PL=OBL and Jew ethnic.group=GEN receiving.orders=GEN teacher=PL=OBL meeting call ATEL=ACT.PST and that=PL=OBL messiah=OBL where be.born=INF QUAL.PRES say=ACT.PST and ask=ACT.PST
'The king called all the chief priests and teachers of the Jewish people who received orders [from the king] to a meeting and asked (said and asked) them "Where is the Messiah to be born?"'

- goˀɖ (allomorph goɽ) denotes a turning point or culmination in a narrative.

saitan=aʔ fanda=te bajhe no goˀɖ=ta=iɲ
Satan=GEN net=OBL get.trapped Q CTEL=MID.PRES=1SG
'Will I get trapped in Satan's net?'

===== Durativity: continuative, semel-iterative and iterative =====
In situations in which an action or event persists for a longer period of time than expected, or keeps on in action while performing another, the continuative marker kan is used.

ho=kaɽ kayom=ta ro kinbhar=jo joʔ kan=te
that=SG.HUM talk=MID.PRES and courtyard=ADD sweep CONT=ACT.PRES
'She talks and keeps sweeping the courtyard.'

With certain contentive morphemes, kan indicates that an action had been going on for a long time in the past before another action happened. With contentive morphemes denoting a volitional and motion event such as ɖoˀɖ 'take (away)', kan may express that the change is more-or-less permanent.

iɲ am=bar=aʔ pothi=te ɖoˀɖ kan=oˀj
I 2=2.HON=GEN book=OBL take CONT=ACT.PST.1SG
'I took your book (and I'm not giving it back!).'

Semel-iterative, marked by loʔ, denotes an event that occurs one additional time or is repeated once. It is used primarily by elder speakers with masdars.

beroˀɖ loʔ=ki=may ro ɖoko loʔ=ki=may
stand.up SITER=MID.PST=3PL and sit.down SITER=MID.PST=3PL
'They kept on standing up and sitting down again (e.g., at a meeting).'

With some contentive morphemes, loʔ does not seem to mark iterativity, but rather a prolonged event, making its meaning very similar if not the same to that of continuative kan:

gam~gam=loʔ=ki=may
RDPL~talk=CONT=MID.PST=3PL
'They kept in talking'

The main marker of iterativity in Kharia is khor. It indicates an action or event that comes to a stop and begins again, and may repeat in successive cycles.

ɖubhni=te peʔ yo=kon kowaʔ han=tiˀj u=tiˀj leŋ-leŋ khor=ki muda soloʔ=te yo=kon peʔ ɲoʔ=na um are=ki
cup=OBL rice see=SEQ crow that=side this=side fly-RDPL ITER=MID.PST but dog=OBL see=SEQ rice eat=INF NEG descend=MID.PST
'Having seen rice in the cup, the crow kept flying back and forth, but having seen the dog, it didn't come down to feed.'

===== Ambulative =====
The ambulative in Kharia is san (< sangoɖ 'walk', cf. Santali sɛn 'walk'), itself is no longer an independent lexical word. It denotes the action is carried out during movement from one place to another.

ol=na olna kayar beloŋ san=ki
bring=INF RDPL mango ripen AMB=MID.PST
'While being brought [to market], the mangoes ripened along the way.'

When san is used as v2 for four contentive morphemes ol 'bring', ɖoˀɖ 'take', col 'go', and ɖel 'come', it rather denotes the sense of 'along with' instead of ambulativity. Kullu suggests that san might be compatible with the aforementioned four contentive morphemes, and in fact the first example is rejected by some speakers as ungrammatical.

baysaki tay ...ho=ki moɲ baysaki koŋtaŋ ro baysali sãɽ ol san=oʔ=ki
Baisali ABL that=PL one Baisali cow and Baisali ox bring AMB=ACT.PST=3PL
'From Baisali. they brought one Baisali cow and Baisali ox along with them.'

===== Totality =====
Totality, expressed by may, indicates completion or exhaustiveness of an action with respect to a particular participant of a scenario.

sori sori chaha uˀd may=oʔ=ki (*ro tam jou uˀd=teˀj=ki)
together RDPL tea drink TOTAL=ACT.PST=PL and now up.to drink=ACT.PROG=PL
'They drank up all the tea together (*and are still drinking).'

===== Suddenity =====
Three markers bhaʔ, hambaʔ, and dhaˀb are used as v2 in TAM/Person-Syntagmas to denote an event or action that occurs suddenly or quickly. None of these words carry any lexical meanings.

ho=ki turthe=ga apan apan oɽiyay dhaˀb=na suru=yoʔ=ki
that=PL fast=FOC REFL RDPL put.in.order SUD=INF begin=ACT.PST=PL
'They quickly began to put themselves in order.'

===== Departive =====
The departive marker ʈu denotes a situation in which the subject performed some action and then left. This word, again, carries no lexical meaning.

maha kulam paʔʈopur tay seŋ muʔ=ki=may. ho=ki kuɖaˀb aw=ki=may ho=ki=te u gam ʈu=yoʔ=ki
big brother Patna ABL first go.out=MID.PST=3PL that=PL behind stay=MID.PST=3PL that=PL=OBL this say DPT=ACT.PST=PL
'The elder brothers set out from Patna first. They said to those who were behind (before they left):"..."'

===== Conative =====
When an action is attempted by a participant without being succeeded or completed, the TAM/Person-Syntagma may employ dakha (less frequently lakha) to encode that type of modal-aktionsart. This word has no lexical meaning other than marking conativity to the predicate.

aɖ=ki=ko mane ɖel=ki=may arjowar gam dakha=yoʔ=ki
ANAPH=PL=CNTR umh come=MID.PST=3PL Aryavarta say CONAT=ACT.PST=PL
'They [i.e. others], uhm, came. They tried to call (say) [India] Aryavarta.'

===== Excessive =====
The Kharia equivalent to the English adverbial constructions involving 'strongly', 'intensely', 'extremely' is bay, itself homophonous and undoubtedly derived from the same contentive morpheme which means literally 'make, do'.

muˀjdaʔ feinga=te leˀj bay=oʔ, "u chini iɲ=aʔ bohin=na=ɲ=ki thuray=siʔ=may"
ant grasshopper=OBL curse EXCES=ACT.PST this sugar 1SG=GEN sister=1.POSS=1SG=PL gather=PERF=3PL
'The ant gave the grasshopper a bad scolding, "This sugar my sisters have gathered."'

===== Autopoesis =====
In avolitional predicates, autopoetic marker jom denotes an action that happened on its own for the subject's own benefit, use, or maintenance, with the subject acting upon or for themselves. It may subtly imply an impolite connotation (i.e., act by oneself with no given permission). This word, although historically derived from an earlier contentive morpheme meaning 'eat', has become grammaticalized for autopoesis marking and is no longer found as an independent contentive morpheme.

iɲ koʈhri=te badli jom=oˀj
I room=OBL change AUTOPOES=ACT.PST.1SG
'I just changed the room around (for no particular reason).'

===== Benefactive =====
Benefactive kay is used to denote that an action or event is performed for the benefit of another (external) participant. It does not carry any independent lexical meaning other than contributing the notion of 'do X on someone's behalf.' Peterson notes that kay is homophonous with the contentive morpheme kay which means 'to lift', but he also states that it appears unlikely to be the source of the benefactive marker.

khawna=ko peʈhiya geinka ol kay=na laʔ=ki=kiyar
a.kind.of.sweet=CNTR market every bring BEN=INF IPFV=MID.PST=3DU
'And [at] every market they would bring sweets for him.'

===== Seldomly attested v2s =====
Peterson notes that there are few more v2s that have limited distributions in the corpus:

col 'go' marks some types of durativity of the event.

u=ghay kam=ga hoy=ga col=ki=may
this=way less=FOC become=FOC v2:go=MID.PST=3PL
'Thus, they became fewer and fewer [went becoming few].'

oˀj 'take out'. This apparently telic marker is only attested in Pinnow's corpus.

ro kaiko hajar memon=te nuh=te ray och=oʔ ro nawka bay=na etoŋ=oʔ
and several thousand year=OBL Noah=OBL chose v2:take.out=ACT.PST and ship make=INF order=ACT.PST
'and after (in) several thousand years He (i.e. God) chose Noah, and ordered [him] to build a ship.'

ol 'take'. This even rarer telic marker was uttered only twice by a Southern dialect speaker:

laʔ ho=te khali khaɽiya bheir aw=ki=may oɖoʔ hoɖom jait=ko mane ho=ki kuday=ga ol=teˀj=ki
then that=OBL only Kharia much live=MID.PST=3PL and other ethnic.group=CNTR umh that chase=FOC v2:bring=ACT.PROG=PL
'Then only many Kharia lived there and, umh, they are driving away the other ethnic groups.'

pal 'finish'. This contentive morpheme however means "be able" when it functions as an auxiliary.

chiɽopoɽo koŋ laɖ=na mare=yoʔ=ki laɖ pal=ke cah sobre=yoʔ=ki
quickly bread bake=INF begin=ACT.PST=PL bake v2:finish=SEQ tea prepare=ACT.PST=PL
'they quickly began to bake bread. When they had finished baking, they prepared tea.'

safay 'clean'. In both examples uttered by a Southern dialect speaker, it is found in context of expressing a negative action or feeling. Its true function is still undetermined due to scant data.

poʔda=ʔ jhaɽi lebu=ki botoŋ safay=ki=may
village=GEN all person=PL fear v2:clean=MID.PST=3PL
'All the people of the village were very afraid.'

==== Partially-Finite and Non-Finite Predicates ====
===== Partially-Finite Predicates =====
In certain restricted types of daily discourse, such as events consisting of two sub-events that are highly related, there would be a non-final sub-predicate lacking some functional markers, often the person/number marker. Those partly-marked TAM/Person-Syntagma construction denoting co-subordination of events, that the following highly-connected action/event is being done by the same argument. They also mark the hierarchy of finiteness at clausal level, with the most finite TAM/Person-Syntagma receives full marking. The two sub-events may be directly juxtaposed next to each other or may be joined by a conjunction like ro or oɖoʔ.

onɖor=e ro sikhe=na=niŋ
hear=ACT.IRR and learn=MID.IRR=1PL.INCL
'We should hear and learn [his teachings].'

===== Masdars =====
The unmarked bisyllabic and phonologically-motivated reduplicated form of a contentive morpheme or the masdar in Kharia can function in TAM/Person-Syntagmas as what is described as a "verbal noun" in Indo-European linguistics, i.e. a non-finite predicate that may also assume the referential and attributive functions.

no prabhu=waʔ janam=te mane ho=ki=te iswar=aʔ daŋ-daŋ aw=ki,...
CMPL God=GEN birth=OBL umh that=PL=OBL Lord=GEN send-RDPL QUAL=MID.PST
'that at God's birth, umh, the Lord had sent to them [His Son] ([Jesus] was a sent-one of the Lord),...'

===== Infinitives =====
The infinitive marker in Kharia is =na, which appears to have emerged from the same origin with the middle irrealis =na. Peterson posits that the Kharia infinitive development may resemble what found in nearby Tibeto-Burman Newari in Nepal where a nonpast verbal form is also used to mark infinitive. The Kharia infinitive also seems to cognate with North Dravidian Kurukh infinitival form -na as well.

muda dada=ɖom=ki=yaʔ aw-aw=te ber beʈi=ki=te um uɖuŋ=na pal=e
but elder.brother=3.POSS=PL=GEN QUAL-RDPL=OBL who daughter=PL=OBL NEG make.flee=INF be.able=ACT.IRR
'But as long as their elder brothers are present, no one will be able to drive the daughters away.')

===== Sequential converbs =====
There are three sequential converb ("conjunctive participles") markers in Kharia: =ker, =ke, and =kon. The first two markers were borrowed directly from Sadri, and the last apparently derived from the contentive morpheme ikon ('make, do'), calqued from Indo-Aryan construction due to contact with Sadri and Hindi. These markers denote that sequential and temporal events being directly related and associated to one another in some way, combining to express a larger, complex event.

dhirom dhirom khaɽiya maha rokeˀd-loʔ paro=kon rusuŋ samuder ɖam=ki=may
slowly RDPL Kharia big sand-land cross=SEQ red ocean arrive=MID.PST=3PL
'Slowly but surely, the Kharia crossed the great desert and arrived at the Red Sea.'

There is a tendency that speakers would use sequential converbs to clauses which feature the same subject/agent (S/A). Although it is clearly a trend among speakers and sequential converbs can appear in different subject clauses as well, the latter use is considered uncommon. In fact, some consulted speakers reject the use of sequential converbs with different subject contexts as ungrammatical.

thor toʔ aw=kon jiŋray=aʔ sori ɖaŋ goʈh=oʔ
few day stay=SEQ porcupine=GEN with send CTEL=ACT.PST
'[porcupine] having stayed a few days, [father] sent [daughter] off with the porcupine.'

etwa=te u=ki=yaʔ haleit yo=kon lebui laʔ=ki
Etwa=OBL this=PL=GEN condition see=SEQ love EMOT=MID.PST
'Etwa, seeing their condition, felt compassion.'

===== Imperfective converbs =====
Imperfective converbs (traditionally referred to as "present participles") in Kharia are used to indicate an event that happens simultaneously with main eventuality of the main finite predicate. There are four types of imperfective converbial constructions. The first three constructions employ marking on the semantic head of non-finite predicate and reduplication.

The genuine converb =ta, which might have derived from the present middle =ta, although the two are distinct in morphosyntactic behaviors.

ho=ki fawɖ guˀɖ katiˀb=ki=may ro hathiyar ɖoˀɖ=ta ɖoˀɖta seŋgor-ɖaʔ raylogaɽh hinte caɽhai karay=oʔ=ki
that=PL army like assemble=MID.PST=3PL and weapon take=CVB RDPL straight-INT Railogarh LOC attack do=ACT.PST=PL
'They assembled like an army, and, taking their weapons, [went] straight to Railogarh and there they attacked [the Kharia].'

Focus marker =ga can also functions as denoting semantic depictives:

ro ho kuda koloŋ=aʔ daru sumbhoʔ=te iɲam=ga iɲamga goj jom=ta
and that millet bread=GEN tree base=OBL cry=FOC RDPL die AUTOPOES=MID.PRES
'And crying and crying, she just dies [through sorrow] at the base of that millet bread tree.'

The infinitive marker =na may occur in imperfective converbial constructions.

...lekin lam=na lamna souˀb=te ikuɖ jughay daʔ piyas laʔ=ki
but search=INF RDPL all=OBL very much water thirst EMOT=MID.PST
'...But searching and searching, (they) all became very thirsty.'

Unmarked, repeated masdar and echo-formation of polysyllabic contentive morphemes can also play the role similar to that of imperfective converb markers since they denote the senses of durativity and iterativity, thus marking the secondary event as simultaneous within the time frame of the main event. Masdar and echo word imperfective converbs are restricted to polysyllabic morphemes.

modi ro saw-ɽay=ɖom ayo aba ro boker kulam=ɖom=ki=yaʔ kaʈa sumboʔ=te gur=kon ĩyam ĩyam maf bor=oʔ=kiyar
Modi and spouse-woman=3.POSS mother father and brother.in.law brother=3.POSS=PL=GEN foot base=OBL fall=SEQ cry RDPL forgiveness ask=ACT.PST=DU
'Modi and his wife fell down at the feet of his mother, father, brother-in-law and brothers, crying, asked for forgiveness..'

ho=ki poʔda=ɖom=ki=yaʔ halet onɖor=oʔ=ki, kunɖuʔ hakon=ɖom=ki=te sumtay=oʔ=ki ro kuda kudi khaɽiya ɖay=ki=yaʔ kunɖaˀb kunɖaˀb yar=oʔ=ki
that=PL village=3.POSS=PL=GEN condition hear=ACT.PST=PL child ECHO=3.POSS=PL=OBL gather=ACT.PST=PL and hurry ECHO Kharia woman=PL=GEN back RDPL flee=ACT.PST=PL
'They heard what was happening in the villages(the condition of their villages), gathered their children and hurriedly fled after the Kharia women.'

===== Participles =====
Kharia has two unambiguously participle markers, -l and =wala, both of which were borrowed from Sadri. The former only attaches to loan words of Sadri origin, e.g. biha 'marry', biha-l 'married'. It is restricted to past tense event only and has limited acceptance among speakers.

The second marker =wala is accompanied with infinitive =na. It is used to express iterative or habitual senses.

kamu=na=wala lebu=ki
work=INF=PTCP person=PL
'working people'

The third, mysterious and native -ɖuʔ can be somewhat accepted as a participle marker, although it may be encountered occurring with contentive morphemes as a derivational marker carrying the approximative meaning of "-ish". E.g. maha-ɖuʔ 'biggish'. When this suffix functions as participle marker, there is no temporal orientation and the participle may refer to past, present or future events.

dilli co-ɖuʔ lebu
Delhi go-PTCP person
'the man, the person who went to Delhi'

==== Negation ====
The negative particles in Kharia cover the scope of TAM/Person syntagma, which is a syntactically clausal predicative structure. For primary predicates, there are two major types of negation, depending on the status of the TAM/Person-Syntagma. The table below summarizes types of negators found in Kharia.

Negator	Note
um	General; non-irrealis and non-imperative optative
abu	Imperative and optative
umboʔ	Emphatic

There is also a fourth negative marker na which has been borrowed from Indo-Aryan, however, has a very seldom use. It typically occurs in either negative commands, with the infinitive, or in a neither...nor expression with a finite TAM/Person-Syntagma:

Modi na siloʔ=na laʔ=ki no oɖoʔ=ga hoɖom kamu karay=na laʔ=ki
Modi neither plow=INF IPFV=MID.PST or more=FOC other work do=INF IPFV=MID.PST
'Modi neither plowed nor did any other work.'

===== General negative um =====
This negative marker always precedes the content head of now-partially finite TAM/Person-Syntagma. It pulls the subject marker away from its original attachment place, except the singular (partially), dual and plural second person markers.

Simplified schematic overview of a negated TAM/Person-Syntagma:

NEG=PERS/NUM/HON RECP CAUS-Lexeme/CAUS/ v2=PERF=TAM/VOICE

umay juŋ=oʔ
NEG.3PL ask=ACT.PST
'They didn't ask'

ubhroŋ um=em ɖe=na
these.days NEG=2SG come=MID.IRR
'These days you do not come.'

or

ubhroŋ um ɖe=na=m
these.days NEG come=MID.IRR=2SG
'These days you do not come.'

Um is also the negative contentive morpheme in general where it is placed before another contentive morpheme:

- Um lereʔ 'unhappy'; lereʔ 'joy, rejoice, joyous'
- Um suʔkhoʔ-boʔ 'uncomfortable'; sukhoʔ 'pleasure, happiness, happy' + -boʔ 'INT'

===== Modal negator abu =====
This negative marker is often used with prohibitive or optative constructions, although um may occur in the irrealis if the situation is not considered imperative. Note it has three version marked for person/number: abu '2SG', aʔbar '2DU/HON', aʔpe '2PL'. The form abu can also be used to refer to a 3rd person argument.

muda soloʔ=te=ko lemeɖ=ga abu ɖe=na
but dog=OBL=CNTR sleep=FOC NEG.MOD come=MID.IRR
'But the dog just couldn't get any sleep' (but to the dog, sleep should not come).

===== Emphatic negative umboʔ =====
This negative marker is used in many situations, commonly in answers-to-questions to denote emphasis. It may occur at the end of clause after a finite TAM/Person-Syntagma, like the example below:

jiŋray diyo=ga laroʔ daru=te yo=na co=na laʔ=ki muda goj=ta umboʔ
porcupine daily=FOC date.palm tree=OBL see=INF go=INF IPFV=MID.PST but die=MID.PRES no
'The porcupine went to see the date-palm tree daily, but it just wouldn't die.

Umboʔ can occur with masdars as well, particularly in clauses that features high contextual density, where it may denote the sense of 'could not.' E.g. umboʔ col-col 'I could not go'. Consulted speakers state that in such contexts, only the first person arguments (i.e. the speakers) could be interpreted as the primary argument that the negated clause refers to. However, this interpretation appears to be only tendentially, as example from Pinnow (1965) shows that it does not carry a restricted reference to the first person arguments.

==== Periphrastic TAM/Person-Syntagmas ("Phase verbs") ====
What listed below are few contentive morphemes that may appear as the finite functional head in a number of complex predicative structures. They act as periphrastic aspectual and modal encoders for lexical content head in infinitival forms. The resulted complex TAM/Person-Syntagmas resemble typical English auxiliary verb constructions.

Imperfectivity laʔ. Being the most common type of the periphrastic aspectual marker, it generally denotes the sense of imperfectivity, including iterativity, habituality and non-present progressivity. It seems to be derived from Indo-Aryan lag- (meaning "attach", though "begin" in other occasions when it follows an infinitive). It may also express with an inceptive meaning, which is fairly common among the languages in Jharkhand and Bengal.

In the following example, laʔ serves as introduction of the next scene background/new action of the story while simultaneously conveys imperfectivity.

hobne=te=ga ubar koleʔ kunɖuʔ jal=te bajhe=kon ʈãy ʈãy toroˀɖ=na laʔ=ki=kiyar
that.much=OBL=FOC two parrot child net=OBL get.trapped=SEQ tay tay cry=INF IPFV=MID.PST=DU
'Meanwhile (in that much), two baby parrots got caught in the net and began crying "Tay! Tay."'

mãɽe, maɽe, suru 'begin'. Unlike laʔ, these words only have this one meaning.

jeʔ botoŋ buŋ thartharay=na mãɽe=yoʔ=ki
so fear INST tremble=INF begin=ACT.PST=PL
'So (they) began to tremble with fear.'

melay 'stop'

soloʔ bhabru=na melay=oʔ
dog bark=INF stop=ACT.PST
'The dog stopped barking.'

col 'go'

tama iɲ aniɲ=aʔ gotar=aʔ kahni batay=na col=taˀjɖ=iɲ
now I We.INCL=GEN clan=GEN story tell=INF go=MID.PROG=1SG
'Now I am going to tell the story of our clan.'

lam 'look for, want'. With animate subject, the marker denotes the volition of the subject who wants to do. With inanimate subject, it denotes that the action is imminent. The latter interpretation has limited acceptance among speakers.

iɲ u ikuˀɖ sundar kontheˀɖ=ki=te bajhay=kon satay=na um=iɲ lam=te
I this very beautiful bird=PL=OBL trap=SEQ torment=INF NEG=1SG want=ACT.PRES
'I don't want to trap these beautiful birds and torment them.'

ter 'give'. This contentive morpheme is found with infinitive content head in permissive constructions.

umboʔ, jiyom aw=na bheir=ko ho=ghay=na um=niŋ ter=e
NEG life QUAL=INF up.to=CNTR that=way=INF NEG=1PL.INCL allow=ACT.IRR
'No! As long as there is life [in us], we will not allow that to happen. (we will not allow [it] to become that way).'

pal 'be able' as a periphrastic TAM/person-syntagma. It however means 'to finish' when function as an explicator verb.

paʔʈopur=te=ga ho=ki ikuɖ=ga kisro=sikh=oʔ=ki hin=aʔ caʔɖom ho=ki rohtaspur hinte ɖoko dhab=na pal=oʔ=ki
Patna=OBL=FOC that=PL much=FOC wealthy=PERF=ACT.PST=PL that=GEN for that=PL rohitasgarh LOC sit.down SUD=INF be.able=ACT.PST=PL
'In Patna they had become very wealthy, therefore they were able to settle down quickly in Rohitasgarh.'

==== Inference ====
The contentive morpheme hoy ('become') is used to express what are termed by Peterson (2000) as "inference through reasoning", in which no direct evidence is involved, as well as "inference through direct results" in certain contexts. It always occupied the sentence-final position, directly preceded by a TAM/Person-syntagma. In the following example, a speaker went out in the morning, saw that the ground was wet, and inferred that it must have rained last night:

ɖaʔ ɖel=ki hoy
water come=MID.PST INFER
'It must have rained' (water must have come, I guess).

==== Qualitative Predication ====
Since Kharia lacks structural evidence for the existence of lexical categories of nouns and verbs, the term "copula" and its relative concept of nominal sentence are not applicable in this language. These concepts are subsumed under qualitative predications, which are divided into two types: stative qualitative predication ('to be') and dynamic qualitative predication ('to become'). The presence of qualitative predicative markers denotes a "narrative description", while the absence of those indicates "a general or self-evident truth".

In the stative qualitative predication category, there are three types of markers of stative qualitative predication: non-inherent, inherent, and neutral. The non-inherent markers express non-inherent, temporal, context-based, situational contingent qualities. The inherent markers express relatively inherent, defining properties to a referent. Both are limited to describe the current time only.

Type of stative qualitative predication	Non-negated form	Negated form
Inherent qualities	heke	nalage
Non-inherent qualities	ayiˀj(ɖ)	umboriˀj(ɖ)

Inherent qualities:

ho=kaɽ hosiyar heke
that=SG.HUM intelligent QUAL.PRES
'She is the intelligent one.'

Non-inherent qualities:

ho=kaɽ hosiyar ayiˀj
that=SG.HUM intelligent QUAL.PRES
'She is intelligent.'

Heke and nalage have been borrowed directly from Sadri. Malhotra (1982) cites some examples in which the negative form of heke is um heke instead of nalage. They are, however, quite rare, and nalage is considered standard.

Present-tense paradigm of non-negated, inherent qualitative marker
		singular	dual (HON)	plural
1st person	exclusive	hek=iɲ	heke=jar	heke=le
1st person	inclusive	hek=iɲ	heke=naŋ	heke=niŋ
2nd person		hek=em	heke=bar	heke=pe
3rd person		heke	heke=kiyar	heke=ki/heke=may/hekãy

On the other hand, ayiˀj(ɖ) appears to be an Indo-Aryan loan, but which language it originated from is not clearly known. Peterson suggests a broadly Eastern Indo-Aryan origin, citing a cognate with the Maithili 3rd person non-honorific proform əich 'he/she/it'.

Present-tense paradigm of non-negated, non-inherent qualitative marker
		singular	dual (HON)	plural
1st person	exclusive	ayiˀjɖ=iɲ	ayiˀj=jar	ayiˀj=le
1st person	inclusive	ayiˀjɖ=iɲ	ayiˀj=naŋ	ayiˀj=niŋ
2nd person		ayiˀjɖ=em	ayiˀj=bar	ayiˀj=pe
3rd person		ayiˀj	ayiˀj=kiyar	ayiˀj=ki/ayiˀj=may

With the neutral stative qualitative predicative marker aw (derived from the same contentive morpheme meaning 'live, stay, remain'), the distinction between inherent and non-inherent qualities is disabled.

jhaɽi poʔda hinte muɖu la muɖu gãysi aw=ta=ki=ga
all village LOC one.HUM then one.HUM spy QUAL=MID.PRES=PL=FOC
'In all villages there are [always] some spies.'

Kharia uses two contentive morphemes hoy and bone, both were borrowed from Sadri, to express the dynamic qualitative predication category ('to become', or more accurately, 'to take place').

u jharkhanɖ alag hoy=ki ho bhere tay ghaɖ, iskul koʔghel=jo ho=ki khaɽiya kayam=ta=may
this Jharkhand separate become=MID.PST that time ABL therefore school vinicity=ADD that=PL Kharia speak=MID.PRES=3PL
'Since the time Jharkhand became independent, therefore they speak Kharia in school as well.'

ʈoʔpo aw=ki, adha fura niga bone=ki=may
toppo.bird QUAL=MID.PST half part Kurukh become=MID.PST=3PL
'There was Toppo [a kind of bird], they [his desdendants, the Toppo clan] became half Kurukh.'

=== Syntax ===
==== Syntax of the simple sentence ====
The way of person marking in TAM/Person-Syntagmas and case-marking in Case-Syntagmas clearly shows that Kharia is a nominative-accusative language. The unmarked constituent order is Subject–Object–Predicate or predicate-final, although the primary arguments may not be explicitly mentioned and Case-Syntagmas may appear in different positions with respect to their pragmatic status, followed by various types of information structure elements depending on discourse-oriented factors.

== Sample text ==
Ughay andai ɖom=ta no ata bhere israeli lebu=ki rusuŋ samudar=te paro=na laʔ=ki, hin bhere=jo khaɽiya=kia ho boʔ=ki=te=ga aw=ki=may.
this.way guess PASS=MID.PRES CMPL Q time Israeli person=PL red ocean=OBL cross=INF IPFV=MID.PST then time=ADD Kharia=PL that place=PL=OBL=FOC live=MID.PST=3PL.SUBJ
'Thus it is assumed that at the time that the Israelis were crossing the Red Sea, at that time the Kharias were at those places as well.'

Laʔ anin=aʔ khariya bulbul, yane babilon, poʔda tay muʔ=kon del/em/-dol arloʔ, serloʔsin ghay hoy=kon utiˀj del=ki=may.
then 1PL.INCL=GEN Kharia Babylon i.e. Babylon village ABL emerge=SEQ come-? north south way become=SEQ this.side come=MID.PST=3PL
'Then our Kharia [ancestors], having left Bulbul, i.e., Babylon, coming along, via the north and south, came to this side [i.e., here].'

Am=ga patar terter heke=m, am, Yesu, ɖe=na=m ro patar ter=e=m patar ter=e=m.
You=FOC light give.RDPL QUAL.PRES=2SG You Jesus come=MID.IRR=2SG and light give=ACT.IRR=2SG light give=ACT.IRR=2SG
'You are the [one] who gives light, you, Jesus, will come and give light, you will give light.'
