= Padala Bhudevi =

Indian social activist

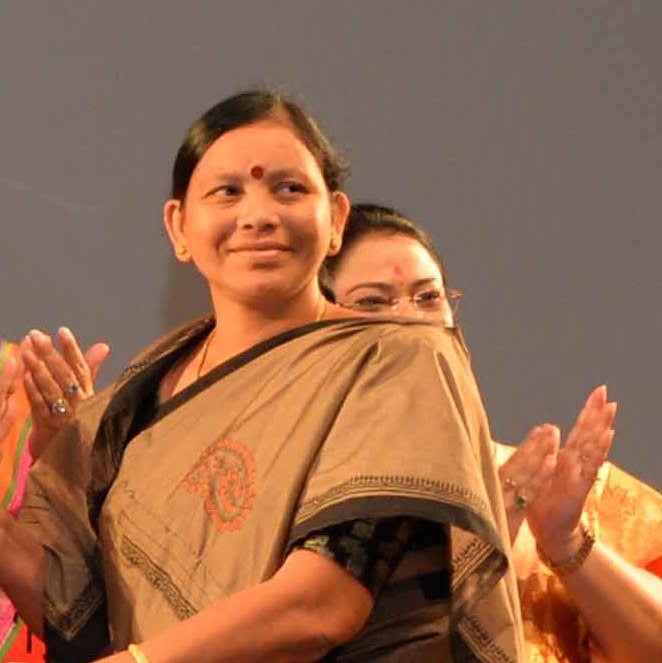
- in March 2020
- Born: New Delhi, India
- Occupations: director and activist
- Known for: receiving the Nari Shakti Puraskar

Padala Bhudevi is an Indian social activist with Savara women to help people to improve entrepreneurship and their family diet. In March 2020 she received the Nari Shakti Puraskar.

== Biography ==
Bhudevi is from the Savara tribal community living in the Seethampeta area of Visakhapatnam in Andhra Pradesh. She was married at eleven years old and soon had three daughters. She was abused both mentally and physically by her new family. Her father was running a charity he had started called "Adivasi Vikas Trust". She started to help people in 1984.

She researches how to improve their work visiting the Netherlands and China in 2013 to see how they cultivated their seeds. She is the director of two companies. One that deals with grain and another helping farmers produce. She has worked with the "Integrated Tribal Development Agency" (ITDA) and she has helped them to improve the diet of women and children.

In March 2020 she was recognised with the highest award for women in India. The Nari Shakti Puraskar was given by the President of India Ram Nath Kovind recognising her work.

Prime Minister Narendra Modi praised her efforts working as a role model for women and widows of how to be an entrepreneur.
