= Sorang Sompeng script =

Indian script

Sorang Sompeng 𑃐𑃦𑃝𑃗 𑃐𑃦𑃖𑃛𑃣𑃗
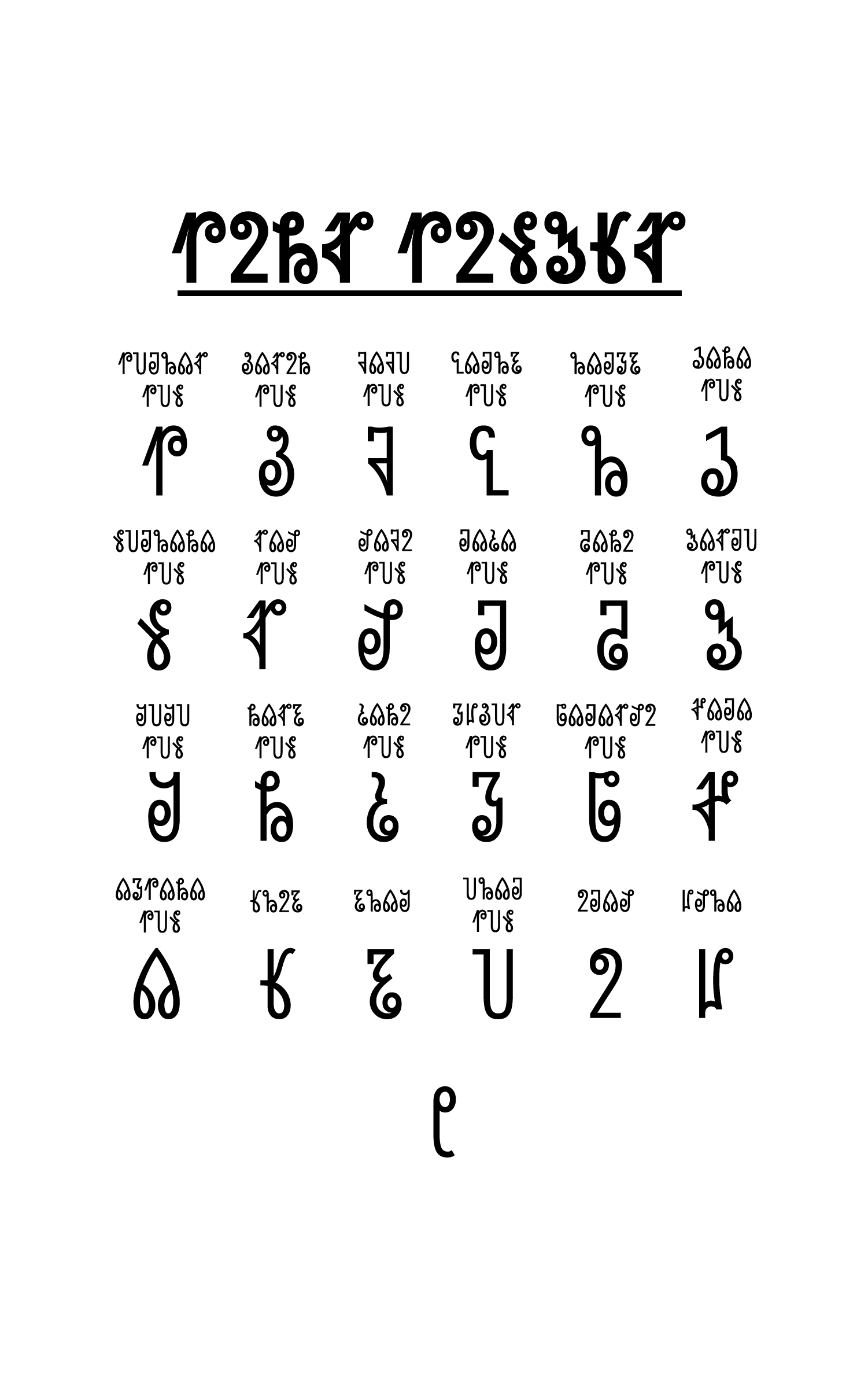
- The Sorang Sompeng alphabet chart
- Script type: Alphabet
- Period: 18 June 1936 – present
- Direction: Left-to-right
- Languages: Sora

Related scripts
- Parent systems: original invention: Sorang Sompeng

ISO 15924
- ISO 15924: Sora (398), Sora Sompeng

Unicode
- Unicode alias: Sora Sompeng
- Unicode range: U+110D0–U+110FF

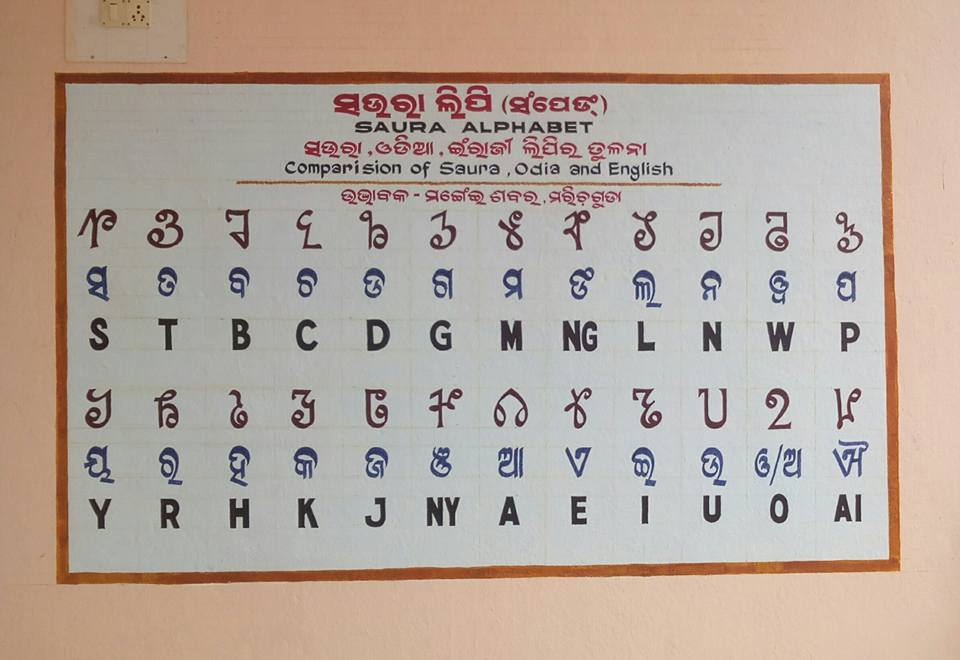
Sorang Sompeng and Odia scripts for the Sora language

The Sorang Sompeng (Sora (Sorang Sompeng): 𑃐𑃦𑃝𑃗 𑃐𑃦𑃖𑃛𑃣𑃗) script is a modern (of early- to mid-20th century provenance) constructed writing system used to write Sora, a Munda language with approximately 300,000 speakers—the indigenous, Austroasiatic-speaking Sora people (alternatively named, and the word Sora alternatively spelled or romanized, Saura, Saora, Savara, and Sabara) of primarily coastal southern and eastern India. The script was created by the self-taught scholar and Sora activist Mangei Gomango in 1936 and is used primarily in religious contexts, akin to a liturgical language, in the rites of the Matar Banom (or Matharvanam) neo-animist religious movement of the Sora. To a far lesser, though still significant extent, Sorang Sompeng is learned, taught, read, and written for secular educational and literary purposes in Sora communities, primarily in the Indian states of Odisha and Andhra Pradesh.

The Sora language is also written in the Latin, Odia, and Telugu scripts.

== Origin ==
Little is known about the history of Sorang Sompeng. Mahapatra (1978–1979) writes, "[...] some self-conscious tribal leaders, instead of choosing a side [with which] to merge themselves, endeavoured to maintain their identity by inventing a new script for themselves". Malia Gomango, an influential leader of the non-Christian Sora, led the movement for a separate script and "inspired his son-in-law, Mangei Gomango" to devise a proper script for Sora. Mangei, "an educated person...conversant in Oriya, Telugu and English" (and presumably familiar with the Christian Sora script) resigned from his job as a compounder at a pharmacy and "observed a kind of penance in the hills for several days. Finally, at midnight on June 18, 1936", he received the script "as a divine gift".

== Letters ==
The words "Sorang Sompeng" in the Sorang Sompeng script

Sorang Sompeng
kah 𑃟 IPA: /k/	gah 𑃕 IPA: /ɡ/	ngah 𑃗 IPA: /ŋ/	cah 𑃓 IPA: /tʃ/	jah 𑃠 IPA: /dʒ/	nyah 𑃡 IPA: /ɲ/	tah 𑃑 IPA: /t/	dah 𑃔 IPA: /d/	nah 𑃙 IPA: /n/	pah 𑃛 IPA: /p/	bah 𑃒 IPA: /b/	mah 𑃖 IPA: /m/	yah 𑃜 IPA: /j/
rah 𑃝 IPA: /r/	lah 𑃘 IPA: /l/	wah 𑃚 IPA: /w/	sah 𑃐 IPA: /s/	hah 𑃞 IPA: /ʔ/	ah 𑃢 IPA: /aː/	ih 𑃤 IPA: /i/	eeh 𑃣 IPA: /e/	uh 𑃥 IPA: /u/	oh 𑃦 IPA: /o/, /a/	eh 𑃧 IPA: /ɛ/	mae 𑃨 IPA: none	

The phonemic schwa /ə/ is represented by the absence of a vowel, e.g., /amən/ 'arrow' is written as 𑃢𑃖𑃙 < aamn >. /ɨ/ and /i/ are orthographically the same letter 𑃤 < i >.

Sorang Sompeng distinguishes /e/ 𑃣 and /ɛ/ 𑃧 but not /o/ and /ɔ/.

The "mae" letter, described by Mahapatra (1979) as an auxiliary letter, is used to mark retroflex consonants.

== Numerals ==
0 𑃰	1 𑃱	2 𑃲	3 𑃳	4 𑃴	5 𑃵	6 𑃶	7 𑃷	8 𑃸	9 𑃹

== Unicode ==
The Sorang Sompeng script was added to the Unicode Standard in January 2012, with the release of version 6.1.

=== Block ===
The Unicode block for Sorang Sompeng script, called Sora Sompeng, is U+110D0–U+110FF:

Sora Sompeng^{[1]}^{[2]} Official Unicode Consortium code chart (PDF)
	0	1	2	3	4	5	6	7	8	9	A	B	C	D	E	F
U+110Dx	𑃐	𑃑	𑃒	𑃓	𑃔	𑃕	𑃖	𑃗	𑃘	𑃙	𑃚	𑃛	𑃜	𑃝	𑃞	𑃟
U+110Ex	𑃠	𑃡	𑃢	𑃣	𑃤	𑃥	𑃦	𑃧	𑃨							
U+110Fx	𑃰	𑃱	𑃲	𑃳	𑃴	𑃵	𑃶	𑃷	𑃸	𑃹						
Notes 1.As of Unicode version 18.0 2.Grey areas indicate non-assigned code points

=== Fonts ===
Microsoft Windows made a font called Nirmala UI, which supports Sora Sompeng.

== Usage ==
Sora remains primarily an oral language. A 2007 linguistic expedition that featured in the 2008 Ironbound documentary film The Linguists noticed "the use of and knowledge of Sorang Sompeng [...] appears to be quite limited". Other scripts have been used to render Sora, including Odia in Odisha, Telugu in Andhra, and a Latin-based orthography that mainly circulates among Christian Sora communities.
