= Nirmala UI =

- Category: Sans-serif
- Designer(s): David Březina (Gujarati), Valentin Brustaux (Kannada, Telugu), Jo De Baerdemaeker (Bengali), John Hudson (Devanagari, Gurmukhi, Odia) Fernando de Mello Vargas (Malayalam, Tamil)
- Commissioned by: Microsoft
- Foundry: Tiro Typeworks
- Date created: 2011
- Date released: 2012
- Trademark: Nirmala is a trademark of the Microsoft group of companies.

Nirmala UI ("User Interface") is an Indic scripts typeface created by Tiro Typeworks and commissioned by Microsoft. It was first released with Windows 8 as a UI font and currently supports languages using Bengali–Assamese, Devanagari, Kannada, Gujarati, Gurmukhi, Malayalam, Meitei, Odia, Ol Chiki, Sinhala, Sora Sompeng, Tamil and Telugu. It also has support for Latin, with glyphs matching Segoe UI. It is also packaged with Microsoft Office 2013 and later versions of Windows. It has 3 weights : Regular, Bold and SemiLight.

The typeface was art-directed by Fiona Ross, produced by John Hudson, hinted by Ross Mills. Fiona Ross and John Hudson also designed the Devanagari and Odia, David Březina designed the Gujarati, Valentin Brustaux the Telugu, Jo De Baerdemaeker the Bengali and Fernando de Mello Vargas the Malayalam and Tamil. The Latin from Segoe UI is by Steve Matteson.
