= Sora language =

Munda language spoken in eastern India

Sora
- Savara
- 𑃐𑃚𑃝 ସଉରା , సఉరా
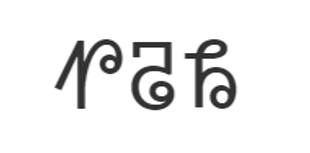
- 'Sora' in Sorang Sompeng
- Pronunciation: [ˈsɔura] (Sora)
- Region: India
- Ethnicity: Sora
- Native speakers: 409,549 ; 61% of ethnic population (2011 census)
- Language family: Austroasiatic: Munda; South; Sora-Gorum; Sora-Juray; Sora
- Dialects: Lanjia; Imani; Kansid; Kampu; Tenkala; Sarda
- Writing system: Sora Sompeng (Native); Odia; Latin; Telugu

Language codes
- ISO 639-3: srb
- Glottolog: sora1254
- ELP: Sora
- Sora is classified as Vulnerable by the UNESCO Atlas of the World's Languages in Danger

A Lanjia-Sora speaker shares her experience with Aadhaar in 2019

Sora (pronounced [ˈsoːra] or [soʔoːˈra]) is a south Munda language belonging to the Austroasiatic family, spoken by the Sora people, an ethnic group of eastern India, mainly in the states of Odisha and Andhra Pradesh. Sora contains very little formal literature but has an abundance of folk tales and traditions. Most of the knowledge passed down from generation to generation is transmitted orally. Like many languages in eastern India, Sora is listed as 'vulnerable to extinction' by UNESCO. Sora speakers are concentrated in Odisha and Andhra Pradesh. The language is endangered according to the International Mother Language Institute (IMLI).

== Distribution ==
Speakers are concentrated mainly in Ganjam District, Gajapati District (including the central Gumma Hills region (Gumma Block), and Rayagada District, and are also found in adjacent areas such as Koraput and Phulbani districts; other communities exist in northern Andhra Pradesh (Vizianagaram District, Parvatipuram Manyam District and Srikakulam District).

== History and sociolinguistics ==
=== History ===
The Sora call themselves Soranji (human-NSFX-PL, cf. Santali hɔɽ "man", Mundari hoɽo "human", Korku koro "man", proto-Munda **kOrOˀ "person, human") and refer to their language as soralaŋən, "Sora tongue." Like the vast majority of tribal and low-caste communities in India, the Sora speech echoed through oral traditions but remained unwritten until the colonial period. A small number of Sora lexical items were recorded by Colonel Dalton (1872) and Pendercast (1881). The British inspector of Madras, Fred Fawcett (1853–1926), later included a short Sora wordlist in his 1887 ethnographic description of the Sora tribe. The first systematic descriptive grammar of Sora appeared in 1931, authored by the Telugu scholar G. V. Ramamurti. The 1960s saw a boom in Austroasiatic linguistics, and the Sora language got the attention of several American Austroasiaticists and typologists such as Norman & Arlene Zide, David Stampe, Patricia Donegan, and Stanley Starosta.

By the 1990s and early 2000s, linguistic investigation slowed considerably due to security concerns in tribal regions affected by Naxalite insurgency, limiting sustained fieldwork. In recent times, Sora was featured in the PBS Ironbound documentary The Linguists (2008), in which they followed two linguists G. D. S. Anderson and K. David Harrison during their field trip in southern Odisha where they visited a Sora village and had a documentation of the language.

Sora speaker playing a local musical instrument and singing a folk song

Ethnographer Piers Vitebsky (1993) states that the Sora tribe used to have wider distribution than present before it was claimed by later Indo-Aryan and Dravidian expansions, based on Sora-origin village names extend along the coastal plains from the Mahanadi river to Northern Andhra, far beyond the current Sora communities. Accordingly, Lord Jagannath of Odisha's Puri Temple is claimed to be originated from the Sora tribe, and the term aɳasara for the period when Jagannath suffers from fever for two weeks after the ritual bath on the full-moon day of the Hindu month Jyēṣṭha (mid-May to mid-June) might be related to Sora root -asar- ("to wipe, to dry"). Pliny the Elder (77 CE) and Claudius Ptolemy (c. 130 CE) also did identify Kalinga as the land of the Sora (Suari, Sabaræ).

According to Bihari tradition, around 500 CE a group of Sora/Savara tribals invaded the region and deposed the Cheros, a Hinduized Munda tribe, and presumably to have replaced them as local rulers. Today, the Sabars of West Bengal claim descent from the ancient Savaras. Partly caused by scant data, Gordon (2005) proposes that Sabar/Lodha is related to Sora, although Anderson (2008) suggests that Sabar/Lodha may be an Indo-Aryan language. An example of West Bengal Sabar sentence is provided in the #Sample texts section.

The Sora language has faced a wavelike pattern of usage—that is, the number of people who speak Sora climbed steadily for decades before crashing down. In fact, the number of people who spoke Sora went from 157 thousand in 1901 to 166 thousand in 1911. In 1921, this number marginally rose to 168 thousand and kept climbing. In 1931, speaker numbers jumped to 194 thousand but in 1951, a period of exponential growth occurred, with speaker numbers jumping to 256 thousand. in 1961, numbers topped at 265 thousand speakers before crashing down in 1971 when speaker numbers dropped back down to 221 thousand.

in 2026 it was reported that only one speaker of Saura remains in Bangladesh.

=== Dialects ===
Ota & Patel (2021) identify several Sora dialects, including Lanjia-Sora, Imani, Kansid, Kampu, Tenkala, Sarda, and Juray-Sora. Zide (1982) characterizes Juray as a divergent variety of Sora, while later studies (e.g. Gomango & Anderson 2017) emphasize both sociolinguistic and structural differences between Juray and Sora. Recent study by Ota & Patel (2021) has brought focus on the geographic distribution and interrelations of Sora dialects, as well as the status of Juray as an separate language.

== Culture ==
Indian Idital artist Namad Dalbehera speaking about the Idital painting in Sora language

Sora is spoken by the Sora people, who are a part of the Adivasi, or tribal people, in India, making Sora an Adivasi language. Sora is found in close proximity to Odia and Telugu speaking peoples so that many Sora people are bilingual. Sora had little literature except for a few songs and folk tales which are usually transmitted orally.

== Phonology ==
Knowledge of Sora phonology is limited, but there are some generalizations that can be made. Most syllables are of the Consonant, Vowel, Consonant form, and morphemes usually contain one to three syllables. There are 18 consonant phonemes and six vowel phonemes in Sora. It is likely that the influence of English, Odia, and Telugu has also affected vowel pronunciation. Pronunciations also change in prevocalic (occurring before a vowel) and non prevocalic environments.

=== Consonants ===
Sora consonants
		Bilabial	Dental/ Alveolar	Retroflex	Palatal	Velar	Glottal
Stop	voiceless	p	t			k	ʔ
Stop	voiced	b	d		dʒ	ɡ	
Fricative	voiceless		s				
Fricative	voiced		z				
Nasal		m	n		ɲ	ŋ	
Liquid			l r	ɽ			
Approximant		(w)			j		

- In Sora, the plosives /t/ and /d/ are asymmetric: /t/ is a voiceless dental [t̪], whereas voiced alveolar /d/ sometimes varies between voiced alveolar [d] and dental [d̪]. Their realization appears to be conditioned by neighboring segments. Accordingly, dental /t/ may surface as alveolar [t] in an alveolar articulatory environment.
- An earlier account by Ramamurti describes the "j-consonant" here called /dʒ/ as a voiced palatal fricative /ʝ/ with allophone [z]. Arlene R. Zide (1982) reports that /ɟ/ is often realized as the palatal affricate [ɟ͡ʝ] or the voiced alveolar fricative [z]. Horo & Sarmah (2015) analyze it as a voiced postalveolar affricate /d͡ʒ/, with [z] as a free variation, particularly in Odisha dialects.
- The trill /r/ and lateral /l/ fluctuate between dental and alveolar articulation, depending on whether adjacent consonants are dental (e.g., /t/) or alveolar (e.g., /d/). Both /r/ and /l/ can freely occur in initial, medial, and final positions, but the retroflex tap /ɽ/ is restricted to word medially position only.
- The alveolar nasal /n/ may assimilate to dental place in the vicinity of a dental consonant such as [t̪].

=== Vowels ===
Except schwa, all Sora vowels have long counterparts. They may be stressed or unstressed. According to Ramamurti (1986), vowels can be short, half-long, or long. Vowel length may denote expressive formations for certain stems, e.g. sura ('big') and suːra ('really big'), but these require further studies.

	Front	Central	Back
Close	i	ɨ	u
Near-close			ʊ
Mid	e	ə	o
Open-mid	ɛ		ɔ
Open		a	

Horo & Sarmah (2015) reported /a, e, i, u, o, ə/ for the Sora Assam dialect's vowel inventory.

=== Morphophonology ===
Sora consonants and vowels can undergo a process of sound alternation at prosodic level based on stress-shifts and morphosyntactic conditioned during which the consonants and vowels assimilate to match with the sound of preceding or following stem, or the final nasal with the initial obstruent of the following word. By doing this, some suffixes will merge with its verb phonotactically and a word can have several allomorphs depending on morphological properties of morpheme initials and codas produced during a casual or rapid speech.

=== Word prominence ===
As with the other Munda languages, the real complexity of Sora is exhibited in its predicate morphology. Long polysynthetic verbal forms with incorporated noun(s) are expected, such as the following example given by Donegan & Stampe (2004):

ǝd- mǝl- tij -dar -iŋ -da -e
NEG- DES- give -rice -1SG.OBJ -NPST -3SG.SUBJ
'(he) does not want to give me rice'

Based on impressionistic data, Donegan & Stampe (2004) posited a trochaic, first-syllable prominence for Sora. In a newer study (Anderson 2018), however, the native Sora informant perceived the complex verbal form as a sequence of three iambic phonological words (_{p}ω) coterminous with the m-word with a rising contour:

anin ([əb-mə́l]_{p}ω = [(tijg)-dar-íɲ]_{p}ω = [dá-j]_{p}ω)_{m}ω
He NEG-DES = give-rice-1SG.OBJ = AUX-3SG.SUBJ
'He does not want to give me rice.'

Instrumental analyses conducted by Horo & Anderson (2021) show that Sora disyllables are always iambic, with prominence on the second syllable, cued by intensity, f0 and duration, suggesting otherwise to that of Donegan & Stampe (2004). According to Horo et al. (2023), in tetrasyllabic m-verbs, intensity peaks on the second syllable and declines on the last syllable, thus serving as a marker of word boundary.

== Morphology ==
=== Nominal morphology ===
==== Number & person ====
Plural in nouns and verbs is marked by enclitic/suffix -ji positions just right behind noun-suffix -ən. Animate nouns generally attach (not obligatorily) the plural suffix, but inanimate nouns may often not.

ətɛŋ kəndʊd-ən-ji
many frog-NSFX-PL
'many frogs'

Possession of inalienable items is cross-referenced by pronominal clitics. Some pronouns may co-occur with genitive/possessive =a.

alen si=len
we hand=1PL
'our hand(s)'

a=mɔd-an
3=eye-NSFX
'his/her eye(s)'

The plural suffix is not attached after countable numerals and finite numbers but it may trigger plural-verb agreement. Numerals can form compounds with nouns; in those cases, they are nominalized and become plural marking by themselves.

bagu-mər-an-ji
two-person-NSFX-PL
'two people'

==== Pronouns ====
	singular	plural
1st person	nen	anlen
2nd person	amən	ambeŋ
3rd person	anɪn	anɪnji

Third person pronouns can be used as definite markers in noun phrases. A reflexive pronoun can be formed with the reflexive enclitic =dəm. For example, anɪnji + =dəm → anɪnji=dəm 'themselves'.

==== Demonstratives ====
Demonstratives in Sora listed by Starosta (1967).

	Proximal	Distal
'this/that'	kəni/kun	-ənt/kun
'like this/that'	ɛʔne	ɛʔte
'like this way/that way'	ɛʔnegɔj	ɛʔtegɔj
‘this/that little’	dəkiyne	dəkiyte
‘this/that big’	dəkəʔne	dəkəʔte
‘here/there’	teʔne	teʔte
‘around here’	arɛʔne	-
‘at that time’	-	səlɛʔte

==== Cases ====
Case marking in Sora is generally murky. There are no role markers to show syntactic alignments between subjects and objects, i.e. nominative-accusative nor ergative-absolutive. A number of case markers that may or may not be expressed morphologically into an animate primary object argument of the verb, e.g. the oblique-dative marker -dɔ[ʔɔ]ŋ- can manifest as a standalone morpheme adɔŋ.

- Absolutive?–Nominal -n
- Dative–Oblique -dɔ[ʔɔ]ŋ-
- Adessive maŋ-
- Possessive a- and -a
- Allative -ban
- Locative–Inessive–Illative -leŋ-ən and -leŋ

eɲjuwɪm baʈiy ar-na=doŋ el-l-ay
axe with tree-NSFX=OBL cut-PST-1
'I cut down the tree with an axe.'

==== Gender & Class ====
Grammatical gender or class is not deeply encoded in Sora morphosyntax. To signal something masculine/feminine, Sora speakers utilize indigenous compound endings =mar (male, person) and =boj (female) while also use, albeit rarely, gender suffixes borrowed from Indo-Aryan like -a and -i.

==== Adjectives ====
Whether adjectives constitute an independent lexical category in Sora is still an understudied subject. Many adjectival elements are found in compounds with the nominal elements that they modify. E.g. sənna-dud-ən "small-frog-NSFX". Other adjectives precede the nominal constituents of the phrase. They also may be used in predicative sentence with the copula (past) or without it (nonpast). It appears that many adjectival lexemes in Sora cannot function as external modifiers in certain constructions, possibly because speakers perceive them as indistinguishable from nouns (e.g. "green" meaning "green one"). As a result, such uses may sound awkward to native speakers and are often rejected as ungrammatical.

Tester: Gregory Anderson. Participant: Oranchu Gomango, 50, native Sora speaker.

ɲen suɽa ɲam-jaʔt-tɪ-n-ay
I big catch-snake-NPST-INTR/MID-1
'I am big snake catching.' (Accepted) ✓

ɲen suɽa ɲam-jaʔt-mar
I big catch-snake-man
'I am a big snake catcher.' ✓

iɲen kuluʔ jaʔr-an nɛm-t-ay
I green snake-NSFX catch-NPST-1
'I am catching the green snake.' ✓

ɲen kuluʔ ɲam-jaʔt-tɪ-n-ay
I green catch-snake-NPST-INTR/MID-1
'I am green snake catching.' (Rejected) ✘

Another way of attributive modification in Sora is the use of morphologically derived modifiers. In such cases, unlike lexical juxtapositions in North Munda and Kharia, in Sora there is a dependent prefix ə- that attaches onto the nominal, which helps link the modifier with the modified head noun. Consider the following example:

lo-mo-mo-te-n ə-manra
rapid-swallow-RDPL-NPST.PTCP-NMLZ.NSFX DEP-man
'the ravenous man'

==== Adverbs ====
Adverbs are uninflected. Some Sora adverbs are: tiki 'after', tikki 'afterwards', mailen 'together', dɔ 'so', əntəpsɛlɛ 'therefore', biɲdɔ 'but', bɔibɔi 'very', annəŋ 'during', nam 'now', aŋaːn aŋaːn 'sometimes', moyed 'previous', moyed moyəd 'recently', etc.

==== Derivation ====
In Sora, nouns frequently exhibit a morphological alternation between free forms and combining forms. The combining form (CF) represents a compacted, monosyllabic, phonologically dependent nominal root, which mostly appears in compounding and noun incorporation. Since there is no attested example in which a clitic interrupts the augmented disyllabic noun, the CF is not a phonological word. The free form is a fully phonological, prosodically unified word and the expanded independent lexical item derived from this CF through various morphological operations, including prefixation, reduplication, suffixation, or root augmentation. This alternation is governed by a bimoraic constraint on independent lexical words. Free nouns must satisfy a minimal prosodic requirement of two morae, which leads to phonological expansion of otherwise monosyllabic roots. CFs do not need to meet this constraint because they occur within larger prosodic domains, particularly inside compounds, adjectival, or incorporated constructions. The two shapes are therefore not distinct lexical entries but prosodically conditioned realizations of the same nominal base. The CF functions as the semantic nominal base in verb-noun complexes, compounds, and adjectival constructions, whereas the free form appears in syntactically independent nominal positions. The CF allows the noun to be attached to a verb root to create a more semantically complex word, similar to compounding in other languages. The full form is the form seen when the noun is standing alone or functioning not in tandem with other parts of speech. Some templates of Sora combinations between nouns and verbs are as follows:

Verb + Combining Form

Verb + Combining Form + Combining Form

Full Form + Combining Form

Full Form + Combining Form + Combining Form

An example of a full Form noun shortened into CF is as follows: mənra, the full form of "man", transform into the CF -mər-. The combining form itself cannot occur in free isolation. It is subminimal and prosodically dependent, surfacing only within compounds or incorporated structures where the larger host provides bimoraic licensing. Although by no means conclusive, a few general guidelines about the CF is that it depends on where the combination with the verb or other element is to take place. If the CF is attached to an infix, then its resulting form will be different from if it were to be combined as a prefix. The meanings of the complements in full forms are difficult to be schematically mapped: sometimes there is a specific affix that occurs with a specific quasi-definable semantic group of words, such as animal names, perhaps that affix appears to be a remnant of a noun classifier. However, it may not be the patterns of many other free forms. Some examples of full form nouns and their CFs are as follows:

(1) a prefix ə-

Full forms and CFs
Full form	Combining form	Meaning
əsu	-su-	"illness"
əbaj	-baj-	"seed"
ədaŋ	-daŋ-	"bee hive"
əsoŋ	-soŋ-	"dung"

(2) prefix kVN-

Full forms and CFs
Full form	Combining form	Meaning
kɨnsod	-sod-	"dog"
kəmbud	-bud-	"bear"
kəndud	-dud-	"frog"
kənjeŋ	-jeŋ-	"hedgehog"
kəntuj	-tuj-	"owl"
kɨmmed	-med-	"goat"
kimbuŋ	-buŋ-	"belly"

(3) Switched

Full forms and CFs
Full form	Combining form	Meaning
gundij	-gun-	"squirrel"
kumbul	-kum-	"rat"

(4) a prefix Vn-/V-

Full forms and CFs
Full form	Combining form	Meaning
enjum	-jum-	"axe"
on[d]ri	-ri-	"pestle"
uab	-ab-	"vegetable"
umud	-mud-	"smoke"
ontid	-tid-	"bird"
arel	-rel-	"ice"

(5). Noun-noun compounds

Full forms and CFs
Full form	Combining form	Meaning
bomaŋ	-maŋ-	"chameleon"
gorzaŋ	-zaŋ-	"village"

(6). Reduplication

Full forms and CFs
Full form	Combining form	Meaning
saŋsaŋ	-saŋ-	"turmeric"
pupu	-pu-	"cake"
tujtuj	-tuj-	"star"
tittin	-tin-	"tamarind"

(7). an infix -ʔ-

Full forms and CFs
Full form	Combining form	Meaning
daʔa	-da-	"water"
raʔa	-ra-	"elephant"
suʔuŋ	-suŋ-	"house"
oʔon	-on-	"child"
siʔi	-si-	"hand"

(8). an infix -n-

Full forms and CFs
Full form	Combining form	Meaning
kənuŋ	-kuŋ-	"razor"
sənaŋ	-saŋ-	"door"
pənad	-pad-	"latch"
ənʔeb	-neb-	"tree"
ərəneŋ	-reŋ-	"wind"

(9). Miscellaneous

Full forms and CFs
Full form	Combining form	Meaning
kədib	-kib-	"sword"
arsi	-ar-	"monkey"
pander	-pan-	"hare"
kina	-kid-	"tiger"
bisiŋ	-biŋ-	"district chief"
boda	-bol-	"fox"
ənselo	-boj-	"woman"
sora	-sor-	"Sora person"
bandradʒ	-ban-	"flour"
darej	-dar-	"cooked rice"
kappara	-kab-	"duck"
ali	-sal-	"liquor"
rogo	-san-	"red gram"
bati	-pud-	"mushroom"
toʔod	-tam-	"mouth"

Other derivational processes such as affixation can produce new lexical items from simple lexical forms with similar or idiosyncratic semantic outcomes. E.g. ga "drink, eat" > g-ən-a-ga-n "potables".

=== Verbal morphology ===
Sora verbal morphology makes use of prefixes, infixes, and suffixes per grammatical categories. In typical Munda synthetic structure, the verb phrase in Sora is head-final subject-object-verb SOV. However, Sora has developed an elaborate and productive noun incorporation system which appears to have originated from an earlier offshoot of proto-Munda. Its noun incorporation clearly distinguishes free forms and combining forms (CFs) of lexical nouns. In polysynthetic morphosyntax, Sora verb phrases display a strict head-first SVO order like those typically seen in non-Munda Austroasiatic languages. The most intriguing aspect of Sora syntactic noun incorporation is transitive subject incorporation, describes that the language allows transitive verb to incorporate (absorb) its transitive subject/agent with the verb stems remaining transitive and object indexing stays active even after being incorporated.

sa:-bud-t-am
mangle-bear-NPST-2.OBJ
'Bear will mangle you'

Verb serialization and clause-chaining can be realized by forming compound of verb1-verb2-nonpast. It also works with pairs of incorporated nouns.

mal-jum-pu-daː-tam-t-əm poʔŋ?
wish-eat-cake-AUX-mouth-NPST-2 Q
'Do you wish to eat cake?'

==== Person indexation ====
Agreement markers in Sora
Argument	Subject	Object
1SG	Σ-ay	Σ-iɲ
1DU		Σ-aj
1PL	a/aʔ-Σ	Σ-lɛn
1PL.INCL	Σ-be/biy	
1PL.EXCL	ə-Σ-aj	
2SG	Σ-Ø/e(y)/am	Σ-əm
1>2		Σ-am
2PL	ə-Σ-ɛ	Σ-bɛn
3SG	Σ-e(y)	Σ-e
3PL	Σ-ji	Σ-ji

Object indexing is not obligatory in Sora. In some cases, the object may be omitted or suppressed.

iɛr:-ai-ɛn-a tiki aninji gudeŋ-le
go/come-1/3SG/CLOC-NMLZ-GEN after they call-PST
'After he came, he called them.'

Possessor of an incorporated direct object is marked by pronominal object markers, therefore Sora incorporation is not entirely a valency-reducing process like in many languages.

lem-jeŋ-te-bɛn-ji
bow-foot-NPST-2-3
'They bow to your legs.'

==== Orientation/Directionality ====
In Sora, there are two types of deixis marking in verb: itive (translocative, away from the argument/speaker) suffixes -a/-ə/-e/-Ø and ventive (cislocative, motion towards the argument/speaker) suffixes -ai/-ay. The cislocative markers sometimes also denote first person subject indexes.

ʔamin bazar-ən yer-e
You market-NSFX go-2.NPST.TLOC
'You go to the market.'

əntannəŋ kuni anin suɽa-dʊd-ən iɛr-ai-ted
then DEF he big-frog-NSFX come-CLOC-PST.3
'Then that one, him, the big-frog, came back.'

ɲem ɲam-kit-te-n-ai
I catch-tiger-NPST-INTR/MID-1.CLOC
'I will seize the tiger.'

== Syntax ==
In Sora, the basic clausal constituent order is SOV.

anlen aman daʔa-n aʔ-tiy-t-am
We you water-NSFX 1PL.SUBJ-give-NPST-1>2SG.OBJ
'We give you water.'

Other word orders such as SVO also frequently occur and are used to encode many information structures in narrative and daily discourses.

1. SVO (subject centrality)

mənra-n-ji giyʔ-lə-ji ənsəlo-n-ji=adoʔoŋ
man-NSFX-PL see-PST-PL woman-NSFX-PL=OBL
'The men saw the women.'

2. OVS (object centrality, passive)

aninji sanil-ta-ji gorzaŋ-mər-ən-ji
They follow-NPST-PL village-person-NSFX-PL
'They are followed by the villagers.'

Particles ati/ate and clitics =ti/=te are used to topicalize elements in clause:

bəru-n a-jaʔmol ati daku biɲdo saroba-n a-jaʔmol ati ɲen arika
mountain-NSFX DEP-seed TOP COP but field-NSFX DEP-seed TOP I NEG.COP
'I have some mountain seeds, but as for field seeds, I don’t have any.'

Floating clitic =na is used to indicate focus. It shows an exhaustive/restrictive focal interpretation when attaches to locative adverbs/adjuncts.

ɲen enegoi=na doʔoŋ-bin sum-le ambin janaŋ ɲen kabɲid-ta-bin
I like.this=FOC body-2PL catch-CONV you.PL also I kill-NPST-2PL
'like this I will catch you, and I will kill you also.'

iʔza tiʔnen=na
no here.NSFX=FOC
'No, only here.'

== Vocabulary ==
Compared to other Munda languages such as Kharia whose vocabulary is reported as having 40 percent of words borrowed from Indo-Aryan, Sora has very few, if not negligible, number of foreign loan words. Sora also has zero foreign phonemes. (Donegan & Stampe, 2004) Sora borrows words from surrounding languages like Telugu and Oriya. An example of a word borrowed from Oriya is kɘ'ra'ñja' which is a tree name. From Telugu mu'nu', which means black gram, is borrowed. Ramamurti (1931) identified three Sora words that apparently were borrowed from Prakrit during ancient time: siŋger (green ginger, cf. Pali singi vera and Sanskrit sr͎inga veram), kaːrella (bitter melon, cf. Sanskrit kāravella), and keda (fragrant screwpine, cf. Sanskrit keta-ki). Moreover, within the Munda family itself most words appear to be mutually intelligible owing to minor differences in pronunciations and phonology. Kharia and Korku, two other Munda languages, share mutually intelligible words with Sora. For example, the number 11 in Kharia is ghol moŋ, in Korku it is gel ḑo miya, and in Sora it is gelmuy. Each 11 in each language looks and sounds remarkably similar to the other 11's. This phenomenon is not just contained in numbers but rather a great deal of vocabulary is mutually intelligible among the Munda languages. Within the Austroasiatic language family more knowledge about Sora vocabulary can be found. The Mon-Khmer language family which encompasses the languages primarily spoken in Southeast Asia has lexical cognates with the Munda family. That means that some words found in Sora are of direct proto-Austroasiatic origin and share similarities with other derived Austroasiatic language families. Words that relate to the body, family, home, field, as well as pronouns, demonstratives, and numerals are the ones with the most cognates.

=== Numerals ===
The Sora numeral system uses a base-12 and base-20 system, which only a few other languages in the world do. Ekari, for example, uses a base 60 system. For example, 39 in Sora arithmetic would be thought of as (1 * 20) + 12 + 7. Here are the first 12 numerals in the Sora language :

English: one two three four five six seven eight nine ten eleven twelve

Sora: aboy bago yagi unji monloy tudru gulji tamji tinji gelji gelmuy migel

Similar to how English uses the suffix from the numeral ten after twelve (such as thirteen, fourteen, etc.), Sora also uses a suffix assignment to numerals after 12 and before 20. Thirteen in Sora is expressed as migelboy (12+1), fourteen as migelbagu (12+2), etc. Between numerals 20 and 99, Sora adds the suffix kuri to the first constituent of the numeral. For example, 31 is expressed as bokuri gelmuy and 90 as unjikuri gelji.

The plural suffix -ji may attach to the head or the numeral. In the latter case, the numeral itself is nominalized.

aninji bagu-n-ji b/ən/uɲaŋ dəku-le-ji
they two-NSFX-PL clan/NMLZ/ COP-PST-PL
'There were two brothers (of one clan).'

The Sora number system was featured in a puzzle by Lera Boroditsky, found in the More Resources section associated with her "TED talk".

== Writing systems ==
The Sora language is written using multiple systems. The Sora Sompeng script was developed in 1936 by Mangei Gomango as a native writing system created for the Sora language.

Sora is also written in the Latin script, in the Odia alphabet in Odisha, and in the Telugu script in Andhra Pradesh.

== Sample texts ==
=== Text 1: Article 1 of UN Human Rights Declaration ===
The following text is Article 1 of the Universal Declaration of Human Rights, written in Sora:

==== Sora Sompeng Script ====
𑃦𑃨𑃙𑃑𑃣𑃙𑃢𑃐𑃢 𑃒𑃢𑃙𑃐𑃤𑃖𑃢𑃙𑃥𑃐𑃣𑃙𑃠𑃤 𑃖𑃢𑃚𑃢𑃖𑃢𑃚𑃢𑃜𑃒𑃣𑃙 𑃘𑃦𑃘𑃘𑃣𑃙𑃙𑃢𑃦 𑃣𑃑𑃑𑃣𑃘𑃢 𑃑𑃣𑃑𑃑𑃣 𑃦𑃨𑃑𑃑𑃢𑃤 𑃕𑃙𑃢𑃦𑃨𑃝𑃟𑃢𑃔𑃨𑃢𑃙𑃑𑃣𑃙𑃢 𑃖𑃢𑃙𑃐𑃤𑃖𑃢𑃙𑃥𑃐𑃣𑃙𑃠𑃤. 𑃦𑃨𑃙𑃑𑃣𑃙𑃠𑃤𑃑𑃣 𑃒𑃥𑃔𑃨𑃔𑃨𑃠𑃤 𑃣𑃑𑃑𑃣𑃘𑃢 𑃒𑃤𑃒𑃣𑃟 𑃦𑃨𑃝𑃤𑃔𑃨𑃢 𑃖𑃣𑃙𑃙𑃣. 𑃦𑃨𑃙𑃑𑃣𑃙𑃢𑃐𑃢 𑃦𑃨𑃙𑃑𑃣𑃙𑃠𑃤 𑃣𑃟𑃥𑃢𑃙 𑃒𑃤𑃒𑃤 𑃣𑃑𑃑𑃣𑃘𑃢 𑃖𑃙𑃑 𑃖𑃙𑃑 𑃖𑃣𑃙𑃙𑃣.

==== Odia Script ====
ଅନ୍ତେନ୍ଆସା ବାନ୍ସିମାନୁସେନ୍ଜି ମାୱାମାୱାୟବେନ୍ ଲୋଲ୍ଲେନ୍ନାଓ ଏତ୍ତେଲା ତେତ୍ତେ ଅତ୍ତାଇ ଗନାଅରକାଦାନ୍ତେନ୍ଆ ମାନ୍ସିମାନୁସେନ୍ଜି। ଅନ୍ତେନ୍ଜିତେ ବୁଦ୍ଧି ଏତ୍ତେଲା ବିବେକ ଅରିଦା ମେନ୍ନେ। ଅନ୍ତେନ୍ଆସା ଅନ୍ତେନ୍ଜି ଏକୁଆନ୍ ବଇବଇ ଏତ୍ତେଲା ମନ୍ତ ମନ୍ତ ମେନ୍ନେ।

==== Romanisation ====
Aparamangtan kitungan riangan do ordaran gabdeletan. Ordaran arzngrzngdam do arikkadam na. Bar jaru d'an a langkan lanungudan dakule do kitungan a janggardan d'an a langka haraile. Ante saring kitungan gameten, paledamte, seletten paledle.

==== English ====
All human beings are born free and equal in dignity and rights. They are endowed with reason and conscience and should act towards one another in a spirit of brotherhood.

=== Text 2: Psalm 23, Sora Bible ===
The following text is from Psalm 23 of the KJV-derived Sora Bible.

Gəmaŋtuŋən-na gupa(ː)mar-ɲen ɲen-ate er-asu-ige. Anin doʔoŋ-ɲen ledeŋgab-leŋ-ən ab-tabmu-t-in; Anin lagadnana daʔa-n ademadem-ban doʔoŋ-nen uruŋ-t-iɲ.
rich.god-EMPH shepherd:HUM-1SG 1SG-? NEG-be.ill-AUX:TAM 3SG OBL-1SG tender.green.grass-LOC-NSFX CAUS-lay.down-NPST-1SG.OBJ 3SG peaceful water-NSFX along-ALL OBL-1SG convey-NPST-1SG.OBJ
'The LORD is my shepherd; I shall not want (be ill). He maketh me to lie down in green pastures; He leadeth me beside the still waters.'

Anin puraːrda-ɲen ab-samag-te; Anin aɲim-damən əpsele roi̯taˀdgoˀd-leŋ-ən doʔoŋ-ɲen uruŋ-t-iŋ
3SG life-1.POSS CAUS-restore-NPST he name-PURP PURP righteousness.road-LOC-NSFX OBL-1SG convey-NPST-1SG.OBJ
'He restoreth my soul; He guideth me in paths of righteousness for his name's sake.'

=== Text 3: West Bengal Sabar/Lodha, conversation ===
təb=na a-undʒi-n-len daku-li kudubə-mər-an bagu ɲen daŋgaɽi oʔon-ɲen dadigti=gi
then=FOC DEP-four-NSFX-1PL COP-PST total-people-NSFX two I youth.FEM child-1SG.POSS that's.all=TOP
'We were surely then four people in total, only two of us four (remain now), me and my daughter, that’s all (of us now).'

== Media coverage ==
Sora was one of the subjects of Ironbound Films' 2008 American documentary film The Linguists, in which two linguists attempted to document several moribund languages.
