= Mangei Gomango =

Indian language activist (1916–1980)

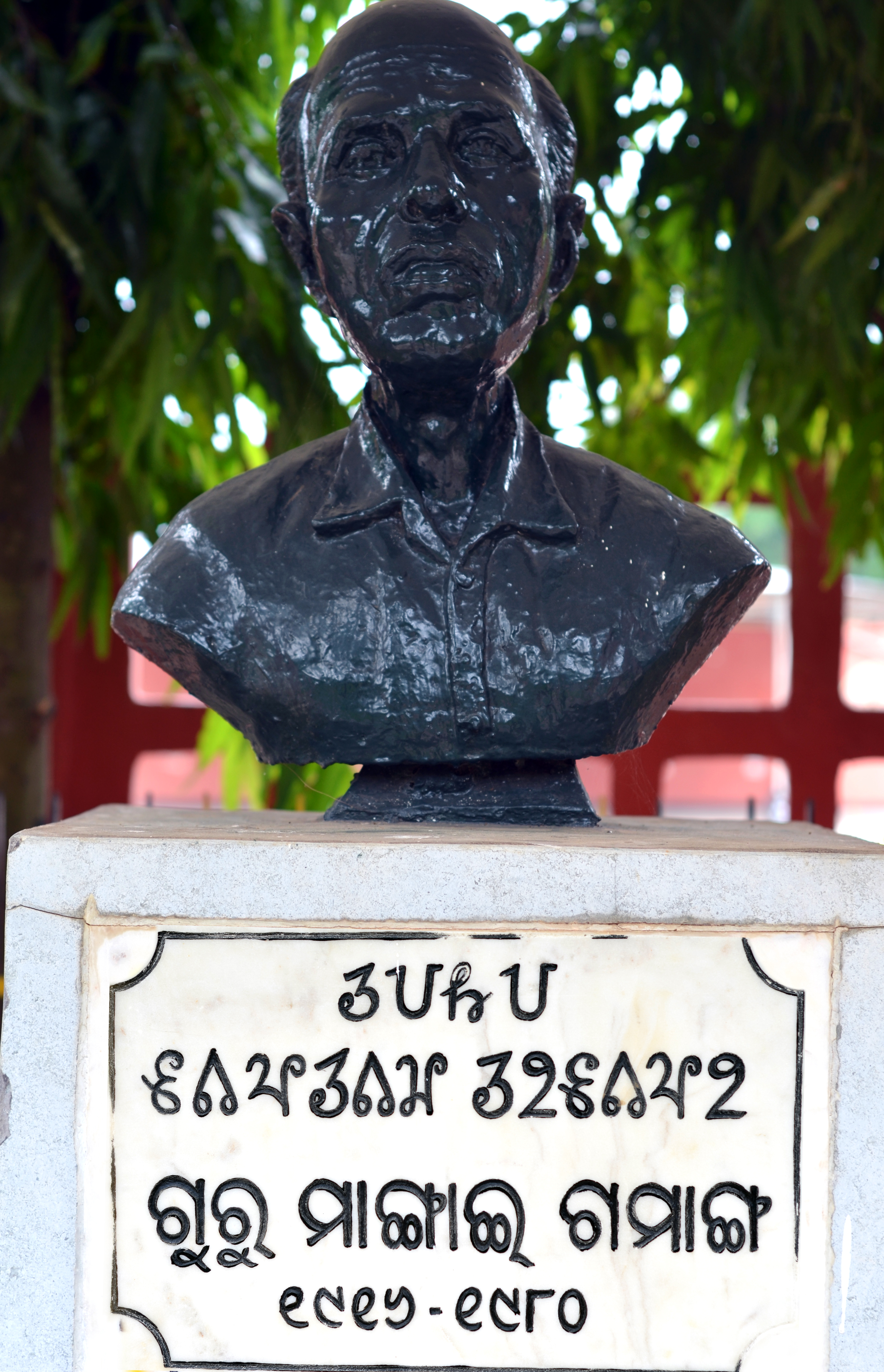
- Mangei Gomango's stone statue in the Odisha Tribal Development Society (OTDS), Bhubaneswar office.
- Born: Mangei Gomango; 16 June 1916
- Died: 1980 (aged 63–64)
- Known for: Inventing Saura alphabet

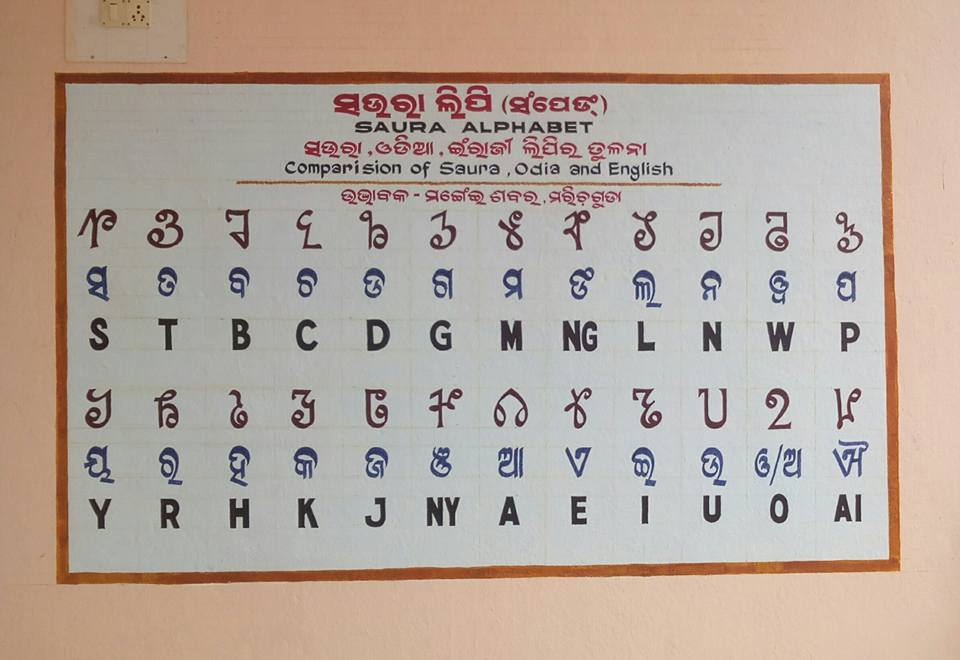
Saura Script invented by Mangei Gomango

Mangei Gomango (16 June 1916 – 1980), popularly known as Pandita Sabara Mangei Gamango was an Indian language activist who is said to have devised the tribal language of Rayagada district. He has been awarded by Odisha Sahitya Academy.

== Early life ==
Gomango was born on 16 June 1916 in Marichaguda, Jeypore Estate, British India. He is regarded as the inventor of Soura Lipi (script). The Saura script Sorang Sompeng was developed by Mangei Gamang in 1966 for spreading the language. As a mark of respect, people called him "Pandita Sabara" (scholar).

== Works ==
The temple of Matarabnam in Marichaguda played a great role in the invention of the script. It is believed that there the Sorang Sompeng alphabet came to him in a vision on 18 June 1936. He was a poet, Arurvedic scholar and a reformer too. In 1936, he established a press in Puthasahi of Gunupur Sub division for spreading the script he invented.

== Personal life ==
Gomango died in 1980.
