= Juray language =

Munda language of Odisha, India

Juray
- ଜୁରାୟ୍
- A native speaker discussing use of Aadhaar and public information access issues in Juray in 2019
- Pronunciation: pronounced [ˈdʒuɾaj] (Juray)
- Native to: India
- Region: Odisha
- Native speakers: 25,000 (2016)
- Language family: Austroasiatic: Munda; South; Sora-Gorum; Juray

Language codes
- ISO 639-3: juy
- Glottolog: jura1242

Juray (pronounced [ˈdʒuɾaj]) is a Munda language of India, spoken in Gajapati district in southern Odisha. It is very close to Sora: Gregory Anderson (2008:299) considers Juray to be a Sora dialect. It is currently severely endangered.

== Status ==
A Juray speaker discussing Aadhaar-linked public benefits in his society in 2019

Juray is at the bottom of a complex interlocking linguistic hierarchy. Juray is seen as less prestigious than many Sora dialects in rural areas of Gajapati district, while Sora itself is seen as lesser to Odia and Telugu in urban areas. This has resulted in speakers of these languages refusing to transmit them onto future generations, making them endangered. In some areas, the community has completely shifted from Juray to local Odia dialects.

This linguistic endangerment has caused the replacement of much of the languages' basic vocabulary by Odia words.

== Grammar ==
Juray has two different verb inflections. One inflection encodes active subjects of monovalent and bivalent verbs, while the other encodes experiencer subjects of monovalent verbs and undergoers of bivalent verbs. Juray also has case markers on nouns, which align with accusative cases. The word adoʔng, meaning "body," is often used as a clitic that is a primary case-marker (similar to "n't" in "couldn't" in English). The case marker also appears no matter whether an object is a pronoun and a noun.

ɲen tuɖud-an manra-n-dʒi=adoʔŋ tij-l-ai-dʒi
I basket-NMLZ man-NMLZ-PL=OBL give-PST-1SG.ACT-PL
'I gave the basket to the men.'

The case marker can occasionally be used in a negative adessive form, maŋə. In positive forms of Juray, this is used after the verb. A plural marker is also used in nouns connected with numerals: bagu kisodanɟi means "two dogs," where -ɟi is the plural marker.

== Sources ==
- Anderson, Gregory D.S (ed). 2008. The Munda languages. Routledge Language Family Series 3.New York: Routledge. ISBN 0-415-32890-X.
- Bapuji, Mendem; Gamango, Opino; Krishna, P. Phani (2025). "Juray: An Endangered Variety of the Sora Group of Lects". In Dash, Niladri Sekhar Dash; Arulmozi, S.; Ramesh, N. (eds.). Handbook on Endangered South Asian and Southeast Asian Languages. Springer Nature. pp. 173–209. doi:10.1007/978-3-031-80752-7_9. ISBN 978-303-180-751-0.
