= Dambaru Sisa =

Indian politician and social worker

- ଡମ୍ବରୁ ସୀସା
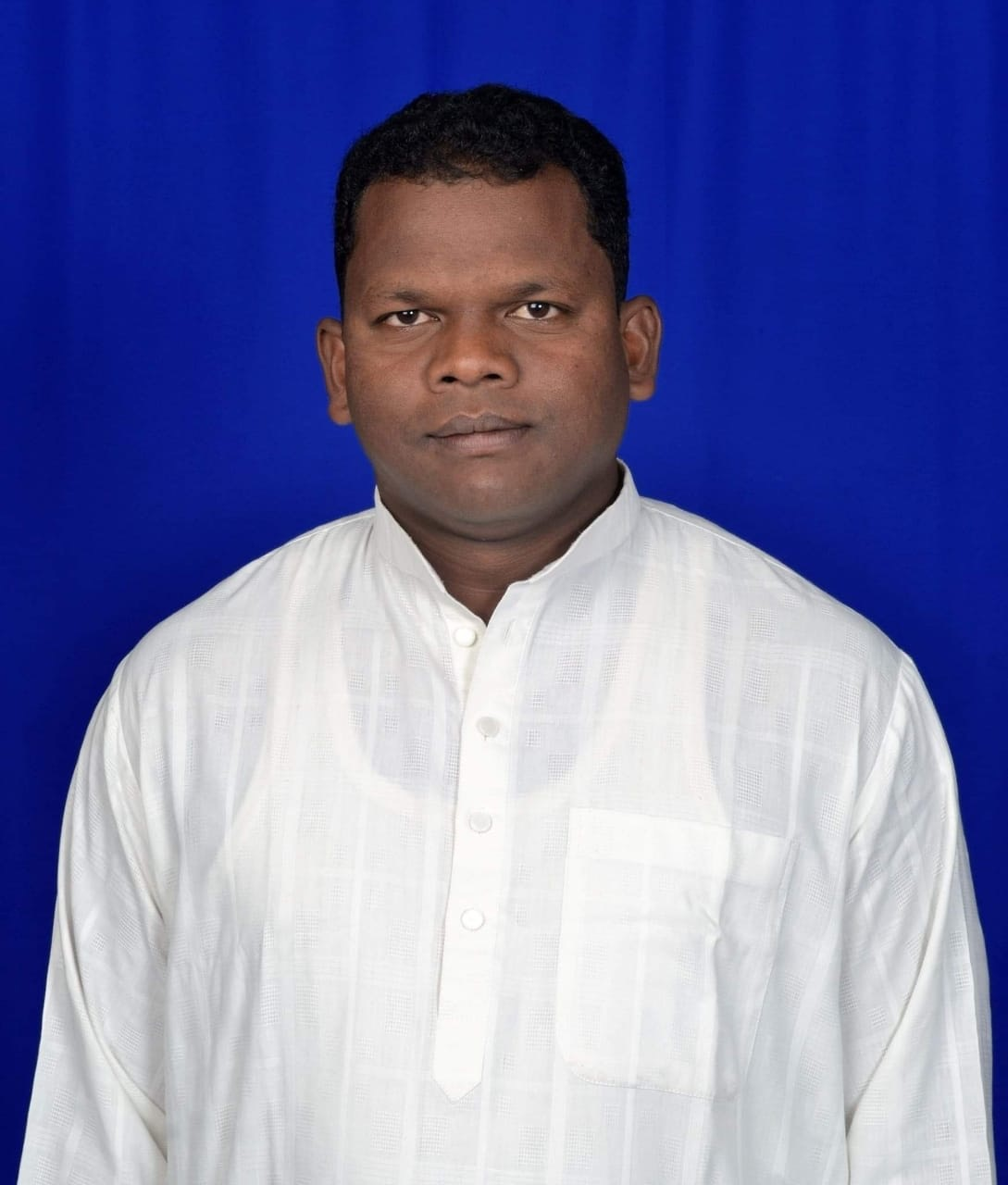

Member of the Legislative Assembly of Odisha
- In office 2014–2019
- Preceded by: Mamta Madhi
- Succeeded by: Purna Chandra Baka
- Constituency: Chitrakonda

Personal details
- Born: 28 March 1980 (age 46) Khuriguda, Odisha, India
- Party: Biju Janata Dal (2014–)
- Education: DAV College, Koraput
- Profession: Politician, social worker

Dambaru Sisa (Odia: ଡମ୍ବରୁ ସୀସା) is an Indian politician, social worker and first Bonda Member of Chitrakonda.

== Early life and education ==
Sisa is born to a Bonda family on 28 March 1980 at the village Khuriguda, Malkangiri district, Odisha.

Sisa earned his Bachelor of Science with Mathematics Honours from DAV College, Koraput. Later he did post graduation studies in Math (MSc. Math) and Law (LLM).

== Career ==
At the age of 33, Sisa became 10th Member of Legislative Assembly of Chitrakonda, First Bonda MLA in Odisha.

== Assembly membership ==
Member of Odisha Legislative Assembly from 2014 to date. Elected from Chitrakonda and contested from Biju Janata Dal party.

== Recognition ==
Award	Awarding Body	Year
Indian Best MLA award (Aadarsh Yuva Vidhayak Purskar)	Bharatiya Chhatra Sansad (Student Parliament), World Peace University, Pune, India	2016
IVLP (International Visitors Leadership Programme – USA)	United States Government	2015–16
