= Didayi people =

Didayi / Dire / Gta'
Total population
- 7,250

Languages
- Gatah'

Religion
- Animism, Hinduism, Christianity

Related ethnic groups
- Munda peoples

The Didayi, Dire, or Gatah' people are an ethnic group of Koraput district and Malkangiri district in Odisha, as well as East Godavari district in Andhra Pradesh, India. They speak the Gta', a Munda language.

== Culture ==
The Didayi rely mostly on cultivation in wetlands and hills, growing vegetables, banana, papaya, mango, jackfruit, tamarind, and tobacco. They also thrive by collecting fruits, roots, wood, and mushrooms from forests and selling them in markets. Some hunt animals such as birds using bows and arrows. They are also known for their local alcohol and rice beer and dancing during the night.

The Didayi people view the Bonda people as their elder brothers.

== Education ==
The Didayi lack in terms of education compared to other ethnic groups in the region. The regional government promotes education, but the Didayi generally do not feel required to be educated. As a result, very few migrate in search of work.
