= GAQ =

GAQ may refer to:

- Gao International Airport, in Mali
- G_{αq} alpha subunit
- Gta’ language
