= Pandripani =

Pandripani is a village in Malkangiri district of Odisha state of India.
