= RAC Paul =

- Born: 19 August 1941; Sawyerpuram, India
- Died: 30 September 1986 (aged 45); India
- Citizenship: Indian
- Education: Madras Veterinary College
- Known for: Missionary work in India
- Medical career
- Profession: Doctor, medical missionary
- Institutions: Virudhunagar Veterinary Hospital

RAC Paul (19 August 1941 – 30 September 1986) was an Indian doctor and missionary who performed medical and evangelical work among the Bondo tribes in Malkangiri.

== Early life and education ==
Paul was born in Sawyerpuram on 19 August 1941, to parents Paul Ratna Samy and Gladys. He had four siblings—two older sisters named Priscilla and Nirmala, a younger sister named Ramani, and a younger brother named Dhanapaul.

In 1957, he passed SSLC and attended Madras Veterinary College. After becoming a doctor, he joined Virudhunagar veterinary hospital and received a degree in 1963. He also attended Emmanuel Methodist Church at Veppery, Chennai.

=== Personal life ===
RAC Paul was introduced to his future wife Dr. Iris Paul by her college friend Chandra. Her father Mr. Walter went to Malkangiri in order to meet Paul and approved of him due to his hospitality and politeness. He then gave Paul permission to marry his daughter.

RAC and Iris were married on 24 January 1972, at Emanuel Methodist Church. Their first child, son “Remo” (meaning “man” in the Bondo language), was born in 1974. Their second son, Manoranjan, was born in 1977.

The couple adopted two Bondo children during their work as missionaries among the Bondo tribes. They named these children David Livingstone and Mary Smrutha.

=== Influence of religion and health ===
As a young child, Paul had not initially accepted religion. When he fell ill, however, he turned to religion and prayed to live. This influenced him to become a doctor and work as a medical and religious missionary. He wanted to spend his life in "the Lord's service".

After the birth of his second son in 1977, Paul fell ill with kidney problems. He needed a kidney transplant, which he received in the USA. After the transplant, he and Iris returned to their work in India.

Paul suffered a paralytic attack on 14 January 1980. He suffered from ill health, including typhoid and jaundice, until his death in 1986. In the hospital, when he felt well enough, he told nearby patients the gospel. He ultimately died during by-pass surgery.

== Mission ==
Paul learned of a need for a missionary in Orissa (present-day Odisha) through IMS News Bulletin in Muthumalai magazine. He applied to magazine notice which asked for missionaries to go work in Orissa.

Upon being selected, he left for service on 15 January 1967, and arrived at Malkangiri on 23 January 1967. He started medical work with the Koya, Bondo, Santhali and Poraja tribal groups. He met Munshi, a Bengali Christian, and taught bible lessons there.

After their wedding, on 9 February 1972, Dr. Iris and Dr. RAC Paul journeyed together to Malkangiri to begin medical work on the Bondo tribes. They left IMS and joined Indian Evangelical Mission, which sent two other missionaries to work with the Pauls: Bros Sasi Kumar and Jeyapaul Sithar.

The Pauls went to Bondo Hills, lived there, and did the ministry during the week and medical work on Sundays. They returned to Malkangiri once per week. Paul was determined to reach religion to locals. He became close with the locals, and they endearingly called him "Mr. Tall".

RAC and Iris treated and helped with health problems such as malaria, tuberculosis, skin diseases, dysentery, and the delivery of babies.

After Paul's kidney transplant, IEM shut down the work in Malkangiri. Dr. Iris and RAC Paul then resigned from IEM and returned to the base at Malkangiri. They continued medical and gospel work in Malkangiri but could no longer work with the Bondo tribes. Without the support of IEM, the Pauls faced financial difficulties, in addition to Dr. RAC Paul's own medical problems.

Paul suffered a paralytic attack on 24 January 1980, and from then on, he had to stay at home and assist Iris in her medical work. He told patients the gospel but was no longer able to continue his work in the ministry. He died in 1986.

== Legacy ==
=== Impact on Bondos ===
RAC Paul translated the New Testament into the Bondo language. The Bondos to continue practicing christianity.

=== Inspiration to others ===
At an IEM promotional meeting, slides of Dr. RAC Paul and Dr. Iris Paul were shown to a group of aspiring missionaries. At the time, RAC Paul was receiving medical treatment at CMC Vellore. One attendee of this meeting recalled being inspired by the following declaration, which was given by the man giving the presentation: "If a dying man is willing to keep on serving the Lord in a dry land, where there was no fruit, or benefit, what about you young people who have good health and strength?"

=== Continuation of his work after death ===
His wife, Iris Paul, continued working with the Bondos upon Paul's dying wish that she and their children would continue working as missionaries. Dr. Iris Paul received the Yoke Fellow Award from the Direct Mission Aid Society in 1988 and eight years later, she received the Robert Pierce International Award for Christian development work by World Vision International.

=== Reaching Hand Society ===
Iris founded the Reaching Hand Society. Now, Remo Paul and his wife Dr. Susan Sunalini Paul run the RHS as Executive Secretary and Medical Superintendent, respectively. The Reaching Hand Society claims to provide medical care, set up local village churches, and spread health education for the people in many villages in Malkangiri district.
