= Iris Paul =

Indian medical missionary (1945–2025)

- Born: 1945; Tamil Nadu, India
- Died: 13 October 2025 (aged 79–80)
- Citizenship: Indian
- Occupations: Physician, Theologian
- Spouse: RAC Paul

Iris Grace Rajakumari Paul (1945 – 13 October 2025) was an Indian physician, theologian, missionary and community development worker. Paul was born into a highly religious family and was a devout Christian. She received her bachelor’s degree in zoology from Women's Christian College, Madras and completed her MBBS (Bachelor of Medicine and Bachelor of Surgery) in pediatrics at Kilpauk Medical College.

Paul was inspired to conduct missionary work after reading the biography of Albert Schweitzer, and began her missionary career after marrying RAC Paul in 1972. The couple worked with the Indian Missionary Society in the villages of Malkangiri, India before joining the Indian Evangelical Mission to gain support for their work with the tribal Bondo people. Paul helped treat various diseases, including tuberculosis, malaria, and dysentery. She conducted research on tuberculosis and became a fellow of the India National College of Chest Physicians in 1986.

After the death of her husband, Paul continued her missionary work in Malkangiri, eventually founding the Reaching Hands Society in 1994. Paul was awarded the Yoke Fellow Award from the Direction Mission Aid Society for her development work among the Adivasi people. She also received the Robert Pierce Award from World Vision International for her Christian development work.

== Early life and education ==
Iris Grace Rajakumari Paul was born in 1945 in Tamil Nadu, India. The oldest of four children, she and her siblings enjoyed a comfortable childhood in an affluent family. Her father was the chief engineer at the Tamil Nadu Public Works Department and moved his family around frequently, including to Tamil Nadu, Chennai and Delhi, where Iris learned to speak Hindi. As a child, Paul was described as rebellious, headstrong, and boisterous, despite the expectations imposed on her by her parents and the rest of society.

Paul grew up in a Christian family and was deeply influenced by her parents' commitment to their religion. During her time at the Women's Christian College, Paul was involved in the Union of Evangelical Studies of India.

After completing her courses in junior college, Paul applied for medical colleges and B.Sc. courses in biology and zoology. Having not received acceptances from any of her medical colleges, she decided to join the B.Sc. course in zoology at Women's Christian College in Madras and graduated in 1964. Afterwards, she pursued her interest in medicine and completed the first year of her MB.BS course at Fatima College, Madurai. She then continued the next six months at Madurai Medical College and finished her degree at Kilpauk Medical College in Madras, receiving a gold medal in paediatrics.

In 1985, Paul attended the Indian Institute of Cross Cultural Communication in Nasik, IICCC, Maharashtra to learn about writing spoken language with the goal of writing the New Testament in the Bondo language. While working with the Bondos, she took a medical correspondence course from the Christian Medical College in Velur. Paul also pursued advanced study in theology and received a Bachelor of Divinity from the Senate of Serampore University in 1990.

== Missionary work ==
Paul worked as a house surgeon immediately after completing her MBBS degree. She was initially inspired to conduct missionary work in Africa after reading the biography of Albert Schweitzer, but she later shifted her focus to medical and religious missionary work in India after recognizing the poverty of those living in the slums of India and how it contrasted with her life of privilege.

Map of Orissa State, containing the Malkangiri district.

Before their marriage, Iris was drawn to RAC Paul's dedication to Christian medical missionary work, and she began her missionary career accompanying and working alongside him. The pair started out working for the Indian Missionary Society (IMS) in the villages of Malkangiri in Orissa state. She used her medical knowledge to treat common diseases among the Adivasis people such as Malaria, Tuberculosis, skin diseases, and dysentery, as well as helping to deliver babies.

After spending time with the Adivasis, the Pauls decided to work with the Bondo tribes, a relatively uncontacted group characterized by illiteracy, poverty, and high mortality. They set up a roadside clinic that Iris operated to treat Bondo villages visiting the local market. Paul spent much time treating tuberculosis among the Bondos and providing women's health care. The Pauls wanted to devote their work to the Bondos, whereas the IMS wanted to focus on the Adivasis people, and as a result, they left the IMS in 1973 and began to work for the Indian Evangelical Mission, who agreed to support them.

After the death of RAC Paul, Iris returned to Malkangiri, where she focused on community development that combined evangelism with medical care and community empowerment. Paul formed a partnership with the Evangelical Fellowship of India Commission on Relief (EFICOR) to support her efforts to provide educational programs and services for the villages. Paul sent villagers to take courses at EFICOR on evangelism and teaching literacy to implement in their own communities. She built the St. Stephen's Church in Malkangiri and established several congregations for the Indian Missionary Society. Paul also conducted prison reform efforts for the Bondos.

Beginning in 1995, Paul worked with EFICOR to drill a system of wells and pumps in Malkangiri; the team drilled a total of 300 wells within two years. As part of an effort to increase incomes and elevate the Bondos’ socioeconomic status, Paul helped set up an irrigation system and channel the water from the mountains to increase the Bondos' agricultural productivity. She and the EFICOR Water Resource Management team led the construction of a dam at Gottenpalli, a region 75 kilometers south of Malkangiri. The success of the dam allowed Paul to set up wells in more villages.

Paul's medical goals shifted from curing to preventing disease. She set up a team of people at EFICOR to vaccinate children against whooping cough, polio, diphtheria, and tetanus. The team vaccinated 8,640 children within 2 years, dropping the rate of polio from 10 to 0 percent in three years and significantly decreasing the rate of whooping cough. Paul also established plant nurseries in villages to improve nutrition. At Gottenpalli, she installed a hut staffed by a primary health worker to distribute basic medicines and treat minor illnesses. During this time, Paul founded St. Luke's Hospital in Malkangiri.

Paul used her experience in Malkangiri to encourage young Indian Christian missionaries to reach out to their local populations and to other Indian tribes. In 1990, she was invited to speak at a conference of youth leaders held by the Evangelical Fellowship of India. From 1990 through 1992, she spoke at several other conferences for youth, helping to incite a growing interest in Indian Christian missionary work.

In 1993, Paul founded Reaching Hands Society as an organization dedicated to reaching the villages of Malkangiri with Christianity. Reaching Hand Society works to provide medical care, immunizations, health education, literacy programs, water resource management, and prisoner rehabilitation programs in its target villages. Along with providing these services, the organization seeks to empower the local people through women's empowerment programs, legislative defense, and political education. Reaching Hand Society has since contacted over 700 out of the 926 villages in Malkangiri, increased the literacy rate in 120 villages from 0.4% to 40%, and established worship centers in over fifty villages and local prisons. By 2017 the organization was run by Paul's son Remo Paul, Executive Director, and her daughter-in-law Susan Paul, Medical Superintendent.

== Personal life and death ==
Iris Paul married RAC Paul on January 25, 1972 at Emanuel Methodist Church in Madras, Chennai after facing initial disapproval from her father for choosing a sickly man of low stature. During their marriage, she helped to take care of RAC Paul and nurse him throughout his ill health. The couple had two children of their own, Remo and Mano Paul, and also raised two Bondo children as their own, whom they named David Livingstone and Mary Smrutha.

After numerous hospitalisations and treatments over the next several years, RAC Paul died of kidney failure on 30 September 1986. Iris Paul returned to Malkangiri, ignoring traditional Indian customs for widows and the advice of her friends and family for her to move back into her parents’ home. Their son, Ragland Remo Paul, announced that she had died on 13 October 2025.

== Awards and recognition ==
Paul became a Fellow of the College of Chest Physicians at Delhi University in 1986 for her research on tuberculosis. In 1988, she was presented with the Yoke Fellow Award from the Direct Mission Aid Society for her "evangelic and holistic development work among the Adivasis." In 1996, she was given the Robert Pierce International Award for Christian development work by World Vision International. Paul has said of her work, "Medicine is my life. It doesn't feel like work. I can't think of anything else I would rather do. It does not bother me when people call at odd hours. I just stay 'til I finish the job."
