= Chitrakonda Assembly constituency =

Constituency of the Odisha legislative assembly in India

Coordinates: 18.11°N 82.11°E

Chitrakonda
- Constituency No. 147 for the Odisha Legislative Assembly

Constituency details
- Country: India
- Region: East India
- State: Odisha
- Division: Southern Division
- District: Malkangiri
- Lok Sabha constituency: Nabarangpur
- Established: 1974
- Total electors: 2,05,599 (Note: as on 2024) (Note: as data published by election commission)
- Reservation: ST

Member of Legislative Assembly
- 17th Odisha Legislative Assembly
- Incumbent Mangu Khilla
- Party: Indian National Congress
- Elected year: 2024

Chitrakonda is a Vidhan Sabha constituency of Malkangiri district, Odisha.

Map of Chitrakonda Constituency

This constituency includes Balimela, Khairaput block, Kudumulugumma block, Maithili block and 15 Gram panchayats (Chitapari-III, Chitrakonda, Doraguda, Dudameta, Gunthawada, Kamwada, Kapatuti, Mandapali, Mariwada, Nilakamberu, Nuaguda, Old Chimitapali, Potrel, Tarlakota and Tunnel-Camp) of Korukunda block.

== Elected members ==
Vote share of winning candidates
2024	35.34%
2019	33.00%
2014	42.32%
2009	27.86%
2004	41.97%
2000	52.68%
1995	52.55%
1990	59.18%
1985	49.91%
1980	52.39%
1977	61.10%

Since its formation in 1974, 12 elections were held till date.

Elected members from the Chitrakonda constituency are:

Year	Member	Party
2024	Mangu Khilla	Indian National Congress
2019	Purna Chandra Baka	Biju Janata Dal
2014	Dambaru Sisa	Biju Janata Dal
2009	Mamta Madhi	Indian National Congress
2004	Prahlad Dora	Bharatiya Janata Party
2000	Mamta Madhi	Indian National Congress
1995	Gangadhar Madhi	Indian National Congress
1990	Prahlad Dora	Janata Dal
1985	Gangadhar Madhi	Indian National Congress
1980	Gangadhar Madhi	Indian National Congress (I)
1977	Prahlad Dora	Janata Party
1974	Gangadhar Madhi	Indian National Congress

== Election results ==
=== 2024 ===
Voting were held on 13th May 2024 in 1st phase of Odisha Assembly Election & 4th phase of Indian General Election. Counting of votes was on 4th June 2024. In 2024 election, Indian National Congress candidate Mangu Khilla defeated Bharatiya Janata Party candidate Dambaru Sisa by a margin of 9,159 votes.

2024 Odisha Vidhan Sabha Election: Chitrakonda
Party	Candidate	Votes	%	±%
INC	Mangu Khilla	55,550	35.34	▲4.34
BJP	Dambaru Sisa	46,391	29.52	▲5.82
BJD	Laxmipriya Nayak	35,143	22.36	▼10.64
NOTA	None of the above	5,065	3.22	−
Majority		9,159	5.82	▲3.82
Turnout		1,57,176	76.45	▲8.19
INC gain from BJD				

=== 2019 ===
In 2019 election, Biju Janata Dal candidate Purna Chandra Baka defeated Indian National Congress candidate Laxmipriya Nayak by a margin of 2,545 votes.

2019 Odisha Vidhan Sabha Election: Chitrakonda
Party	Candidate	Votes	%	±%
BJD	Purna Chandra Baka	41,192	33.00	▼9.32
INC	Laxmipriya Nayak	38,647	31.00	▲10.48
BJP	Padu Majhi	29,579	23.70	▲8.20
NOTA	None of the above	4158	3.22	▲0.77
Majority		2,545	2.00	▼19.80
Turnout		1,28,981	68.26	▼1.53
BJD hold				

=== 2014 ===
In 2014 election, Biju Janata Dal candidate Dambaru Sisa defeated Indian National Congress candidate Sunadhar Kakari by a margin of 24,730 votes.

2014 Odisha Vidhan Sabha election: Chitrakonda
Party	Candidate	Votes	%	±%
BJD	Dambaru Sisa	48,000	42.32	▲14.77
INC	Sunadhar Kakari	23,270	20.52	▼7.34
BJP	Sarat Chandra Buruda	17,578	15.5	▲1.0
NOTA	None of the above	3,591	2.45	−
Majority		24,730	21.80	▲21.48
Turnout		1,13,414	69.79	▲18.54
Registered electors		1,62,511		
BJD gain from INC				

=== 2009 ===
In 2009 election, Indian National Congress candidate Mamta Madhi defeated Biju Janata Dal candidate Dambaru Sisa by a margin of 260 votes.

2009 Odisha Vidhan Sabha Election: Chitrakonda
Party	Candidate	Votes	%	±%
INC	Mamta Madhi	22,822	27.86	−
BJD	Dambaru Sisa	22,562	27.55	−
BJP	Sukra Muduli	11,874	14.50	−
Independent	Prahlad Dora	6,983	8.53	−
Majority		260	0.32 (Note: %of total valid votes)	−
Turnout		81,907	51.25 (Note: 2004 Voter turnout was 59.06%)	▼7.81
INC gain from BJP				
