= Mangu Khilla =

Indian politician

Member of Odisha Legislative Assembly
- Incumbent
- Assumed office 4 June 2024
- Preceded by: Purna Chandra Baka
- Constituency: Chitrakonda

Personal details
- Party: Indian National Congress
- Profession: Politician

Mangu Khilla is an Indian politician who was elected to the Odisha Legislative Assembly from Chitrakonda as a member of the Indian National Congress.
