= Laxman Nayak =

Indian freedom fighter (1899–1943)

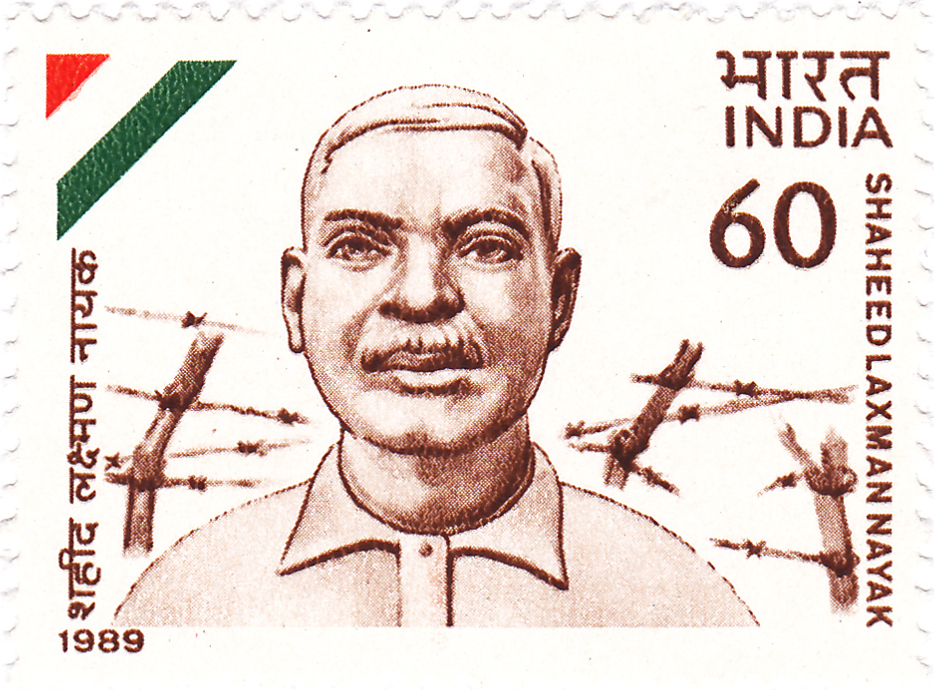
- Born: 22 November 1899; Tentuligumma, Madras Presidency(Now Boipariguda Block of Koraput District), Odisha, India
- Died: 29 March 1943 (aged 43); Brahmapur Jail, Odisha, India

Laxman Nayak or Laxman Naik (22 November 1899 – 29 March 1943) was an Indian tribal leader and freedom fighter from Odisha. A member of the Bhumia tribe, he played an important role in mobilising tribal communities in Koraput district during the Indian independence movement. Influenced by the ideas of Mahatma Gandhi and the programmes of the Indian National Congress, Nayak worked to spread political awareness and social reform among tribal populations in southern Odisha.

Nayak is particularly remembered for his role in the Quit India Movement of 1942. During the movement he led a protest march to the Mathili police station in Koraput district. Following the protest and the violence that occurred during the demonstration, he was arrested by the authorities of British India and later convicted in connection with the death of a forest guard. He was executed by hanging at Berhampur Jail on 29 March 1943 and is regarded as one of the prominent tribal martyrs of the Indian freedom struggle.

== Early life ==
Laxman Nayak was born on 22 November 1899 in Tentuligumma village in the Koraput region of the then Madras Presidency of British India. His father, Padlam Nayak, served as a Mustadaar (village headman) under the administration of the Jeypore Estate. Growing up in a tribal community that faced economic hardship and administrative control under colonial rule, Nayak developed an early awareness of the social and economic problems faced by indigenous communities in the region.

== Role in the Indian independence movement ==
Nayak later came into contact with activists of the Indian National Congress and became influenced by the ideas of Mahatma Gandhi. Inspired by Gandhian principles of non-violence, self-reliance and rural development, he began working among tribal communities to spread awareness about the nationalist movement.

He encouraged villagers to adopt khadi, promoted education and social reform, and campaigned against alcoholism and exploitation in tribal society. Through his efforts, nationalist ideas gradually spread among tribal communities in the Koraput region, leading to increased participation of tribal people in the freedom movement.

== Quit India Movement ==
During the Quit India Movement launched in 1942, Nayak organised a procession of tribal protesters to the Mathili police station in Koraput district as part of demonstrations against British rule. The protest aimed to express opposition to colonial policies and symbolically hoist the national flag.

Police forces opened fire on the gathering, resulting in casualties among the protesters. In the aftermath of the incident, Nayak was arrested by British authorities and charged in connection with the death of a forest guard during the unrest. He was subsequently tried by a colonial court and sentenced to death.

== Execution ==
Laxman Nayak was executed by hanging on 29 March 1943 at Berhampur Jail in present-day Odisha. His execution became a symbol of resistance and sacrifice in the tribal regions of eastern India.

== Legacy ==
Laxman Nayak is remembered in Odisha as a martyr of the Indian freedom struggle and as a leader who mobilised tribal communities against colonial rule. Several memorials and statues have been erected in his honour across the state, and his birth anniversary is commemorated by government institutions and social organisations. His contribution to the nationalist movement is particularly recognised in the tribal regions of southern Odisha.

== See also ==
- Indian independence movement
- Quit India Movement
- Mahatma Gandhi
- Koraput district
