= Mathili =

- Town
- Location in Odisha, India Mathili (India)
- Coordinates: 18.33°N 82.12°E
- Country: India
- State: Odisha
- District: Malkangiri
- Elevation: 170 m (560 ft)

Population
  - Total: 20,000

Languages
  - Official: Odia
- Time zone: UTC+5:30 (IST)
- PIN: 764044
- Telephone code: 06864
- Vehicle registration: OD-30
- Website: odisha.gov.in

Mathili is a town and an administrative block headquarters of Malkangiri district, Odisha, India.

The Sports festival of the Annual, 'Malyabanta Mahotsav'-2009, the cultural festival of Malkangiri district, will start from Mathili on 19 October

== Geography ==
Mathili is located at 18.33°N 82.12°E. It has an average elevation of 170 metres (558 feet).

== History ==
Mathili came into National News when Laxman Nayak or Laxman Naik (22 November 1899 – 29 March 1943), the greatest freedom fighter ever this place had led the tribals for a non-cooperation movement against the British. He was a follower of non-violence principle of Mahatma Gandhi. In 1942, he led a demonstration in Mathili on 21 August police opened fire at the peaceful mob killing and demonstrators namely Nakula Pujari, Samara Nayak, Narasingha Bhumia and Linga Kotia. In this incident, a forest guard namely G.Ramaya was killed for which Laxman Naik was accused of and arrested. The trial continued for four months and on 13 November 1942 the then Sessions Judge V.Ramanathan put forward his verdict, " Accused No.1 Sri Laxman Naik is convicted under section 302 I.P.C. and sentenced to death subject to confirmation by the Hon'ble High Court ".
