= Mamta Madhi =

Indian politician

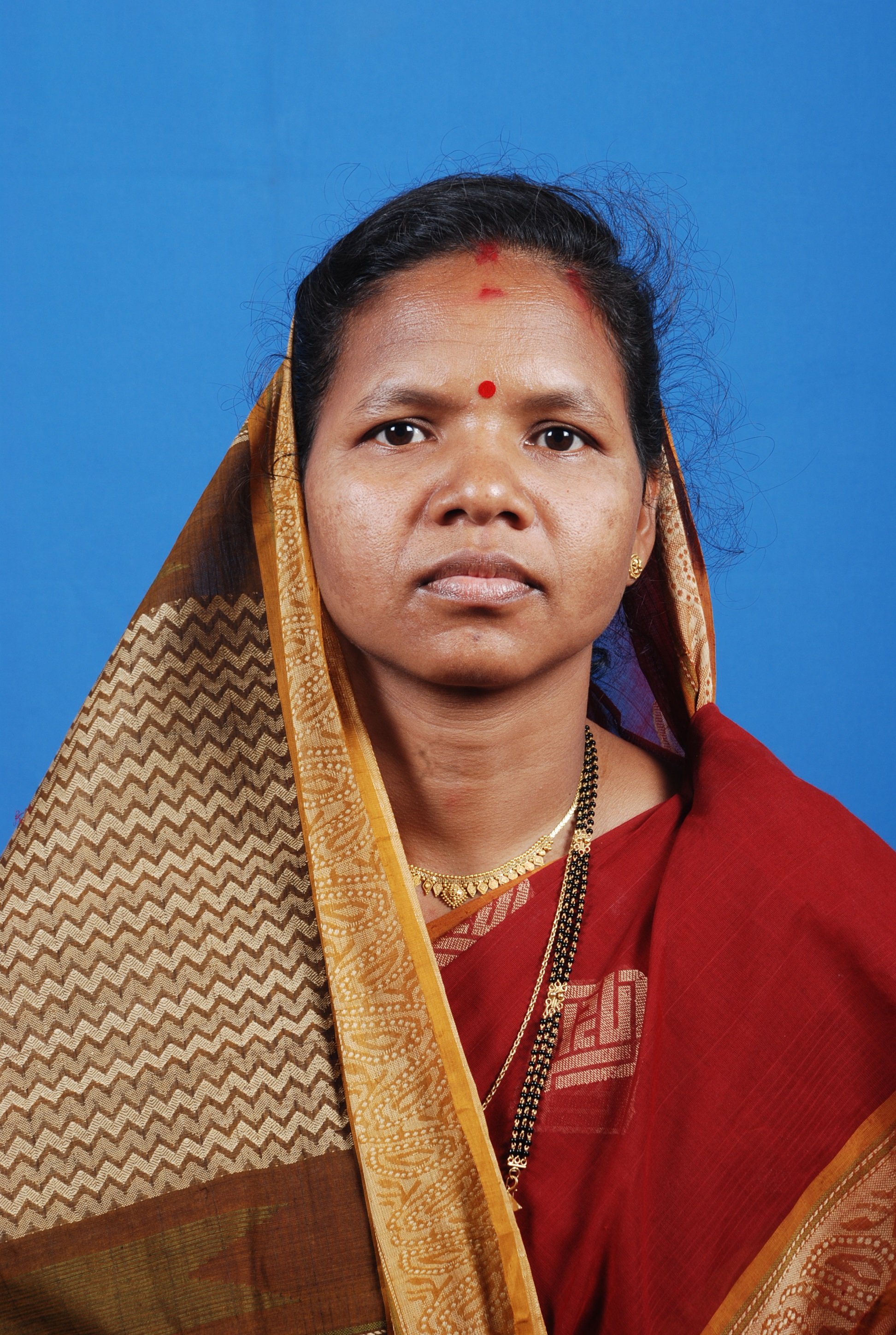

Member of the Odisha Legislative Assembly
- In office 2009-2014
- Preceded by: Prahallad Dora
- Succeeded by: Dambaru Sisa
- In office 2000-2004
- Preceded by: Gangadhar Madhi
- Succeeded by: Prahallad Dora
- Constituency: Chitrakonda

Personal details
- Born: 11 December 1971 (age 54)
- Party: Indian National Congress
- Spouse: Naba Kishore Madhi

Mamta Madhi is an Indian politician. She was elected to the Odisha Legislative Assembly as a member of the Indian National Congress.
