= Bonda people =

Munda ethnic group from Odisha, India

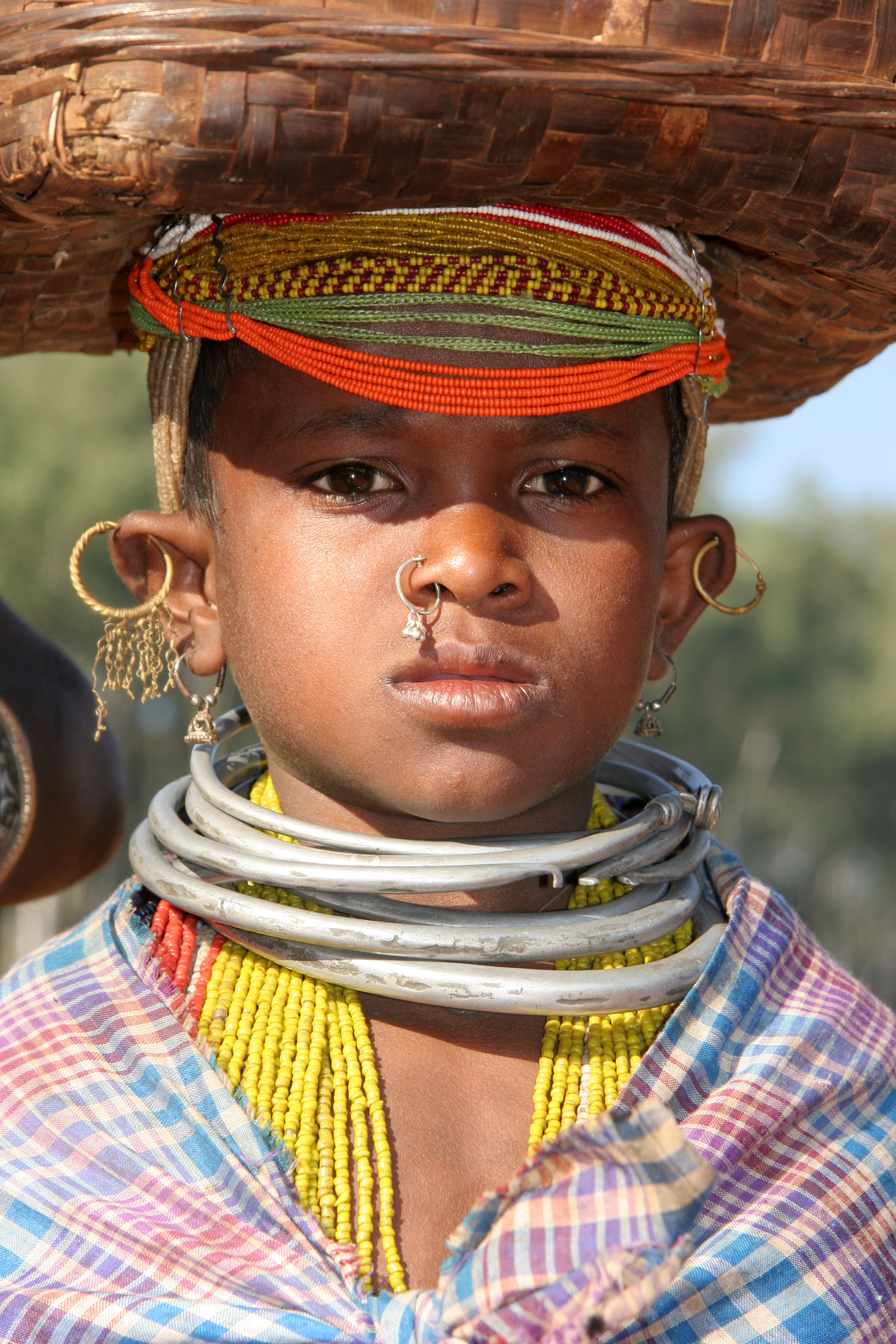
- A young Bonda girl

Total population
- 12,231

Regions with significant populations
- India

Languages
- Bonda

Related ethnic groups
- Mundas, Ho, Santhal and other Mon-Khmers

The Bonda (also known as the Bondo, Bondo Poraja, Bhonda, or Remo) are a Munda ethnic group numbering approximately 12,000 (2011 census) who live in the isolated hill regions of the Malkangiri district of southwestern Odisha, India, near the junction of the three states of Odisha, Chhattisgarh, and Andhra Pradesh. They are classified as Scheduled Tribes.

== Bonda culture ==
The Bonda people are a tribal people who currently live in the hills of Odisha's Malkangiri district in India. There are two different Bonda tribes: the Upper Bondas, with a population of 6,700, who are the most isolated from mainstream Indian society, and the Lower Bonda with a population of 17,000. Upper Bondas have almost no connection to the outside world. Dambaru Sisha took the oath of office to become the first MLA to the Bonda tribe, to which he traces his ancestry. Sisha attempts to protect the traditions and culture of the people while providing them with educational opportunities. Only 6% of Bondas are literate. The life expectancy of the tribe is so low that they are nearly extinct.

The unfree labour or Goti system in India is known as Gufam by the Bonda people. According to Pati, a male bonded labour is called Gufam-Rem, whereas a female laborer is a Gufam-Boy. Bonda people are often led to bonded labour through marriage, also known as diosing.

A form of dowry (known as Gining) is paid for brides. In Gining items are used to determine how many arranged marriages will take place. For instance, the number of cows relies upon the social status of the girl.

Bonda boys are expected to marry between the ages of 10 and 12. Although a man may pay the price of a bride for his brother, the brother must always return the amount owed.

Divorce, also known as “Lung Sisi”, is also an issue within the Bonda people. In some extreme circumstances, such as if a Bonda woman is divorced for adultery, the former husband demands double the price that was paid for their marriage. The village council determines the severity of the case and arrives at a decision based upon the number of cows given back. However, if a man is the one who caused the wrong which resulted in divorce, he can no longer get married through an arranged marriage system.

When a death or mora occurs, it is custom to sacrifice a cow on the tenth day, a practice also known as “Gaitang.”

The chief god of the Bondo people is called Mahāprabhu (lit. 'Great Lord').

Population growth in the Bonda Hills in India led to forest habitat, although there existed a well-balanced ecosystem. Poverty, however, became a fundamental issue among the Bonda people due to social customs regarding obligatory marriages and deaths, along with myriad other socio-religious practices. These customs did not improve health conditions nor economic status, which has created much poverty for them. For instance, crop production is hardly able to feed the population. In order to overcome starvation, the Bonda people, or Ku duburu Remo, often take out loans ( Kalantar or Badi) in order to eat. The loans are usually in cash and are taken from a community member or a figure that serves as a landlord Sakar Remo. Roughly 62 out of 245 households in the Bonda hills are in debt. Loans taken even in cash are charged interest rates, and these funds often provide payments for: bride prices, fines, and the performance of socio-religious rites. As a result, debt payment becomes difficult, with constant fines and interest rates being increased. Very often, the Bonda people are led to debt bondage and are forced to liquidate assets such as: land, trees, animals, etc.

== Bonda language ==
The Bonda are a scheduled tribe of India and are also known as the Remo (meaning "people" in the Bonda language). The tribe is one of the oldest and most primitive in mainland India; their culture has changed little for more than a thousand years. They are one of the 75 Particularly Vulnerable Tribal Groups identified by the Government of India. Their isolation and known aggressiveness continue to preserve their culture despite the pressures of an expanding Indian population. Their language belongs to the Munda branch of the Austroasiatic language family. It is most closely related to the Gutob language.

Realizing that the Bonda people were in a cultural decline, the Government of Odisha brought to life the Bonda Development Agency (BDA) in 1977. Despite the initiatives taken by the Bonda Development Agency since then, the literacy rates of the Bonda tribes remain one of the lowest, as low as 14 percent.

Two of the most important phonetic features that characterize the Bonda language are the glottal stop, which is a glottal plosive produced by the release of the breath behind the vocal cords, and checked consonants. Those sounds are also featured in Munda languages as a whole. It is the checked consonants k’ and p’ that occur in Bonda, found mostly in the final position of native words. The glottal stop, however, may occur initially in native words. In fact, the checked consonants k’ and p’ are pre-glottalized. The checked consonants behave differently in Bonda depending on whether they are followed by a vowel or another consonant. It has been found that when k’ and p’ are followed by a vowel their glottal stop remains, but they become the sounds g and b. It currently appears as though the Bonda k' is being fully replaced by the g sound. This may be a product of recent Bonda assimilation into contemporary Indian culture. It is resulting in the loss of one of the original Bonda sounds.

== Attire ==
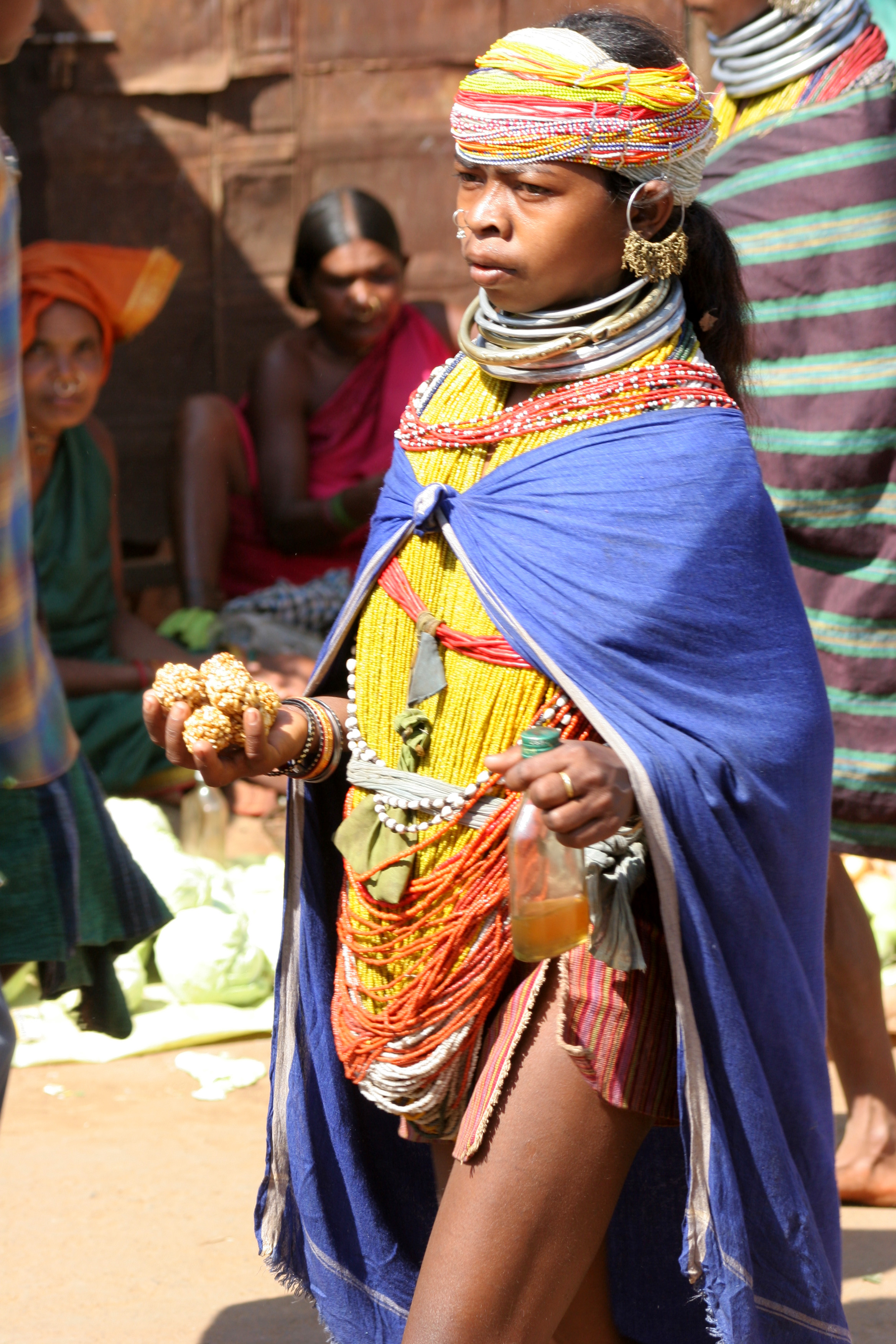
A Bonda woman in traditional attire.

Gobardhan Panda narrating the Bonda origin myth in Bonda, with interpretation in Odia

The Bonda are generally semi-clothed, the women wear thick silver neck bands. The Bonda attire is explained in a legend relating to the Ramayana. According to it, some Bonda women chanced upon Sita who was bathing at a pond in the Bonda hills and, seeing her naked, they sniggered. Enraged, Sita cursed them to a life where they would be condemned to remaining naked and having their heads shaven. When the Bonda women pleaded forgiveness, Sita gave them a piece of cloth she tore off her sari. This explains, according to the legend, why Bonda women have shorn heads and wear only a ringa, a length of cloth that covers the waist. Their torsos are covered in strings of colourful beads. Bonda women also wear metal rings that cover their necks and bangles on their arms. Since Bonda women hunt and forage for food in the forest it is thought that these ornaments have a function of protecting them from injuries and attacks by wild animals.

Bonda women have their heads shaved and adorned with two types of headbands, called turuba and lobeda. The turuba is made of grass and the lobeda made of beads. Worn together the turuba secures the lobeda by preventing the beaded headband from slipping off the woman's head. Bonda women wear metal bands adorning their necks, which are called khagla and are made from aluminum. Including the bands around their neck, necklaces made of beads are also worn, these are called Mali. Due to the culture surrounding their ringa cloth which covers the waist down, the khagla and Mali act as a sort of clothing for the upper body of the women. Both men and women of the tribe wear earrings called limbi made of brass, and rings on their fingers called orti made of aluminum. For bachelors or newly married men, it is customary to wear their own set of ornaments. Beginning at the ages of eight or nine, males will adorn their bodies with headbands called ornaghboh, bangles called sungrai, necklaces called thangimali, earrings called unsurul, and rings called sanbah. Once married, men typically do not continue to adorn their bodies with more ornaments.

== Gender roles ==
A Bonda man and an Odia man discuss, in Bonda, and drink ceremonial pendom in a Malkangiri village

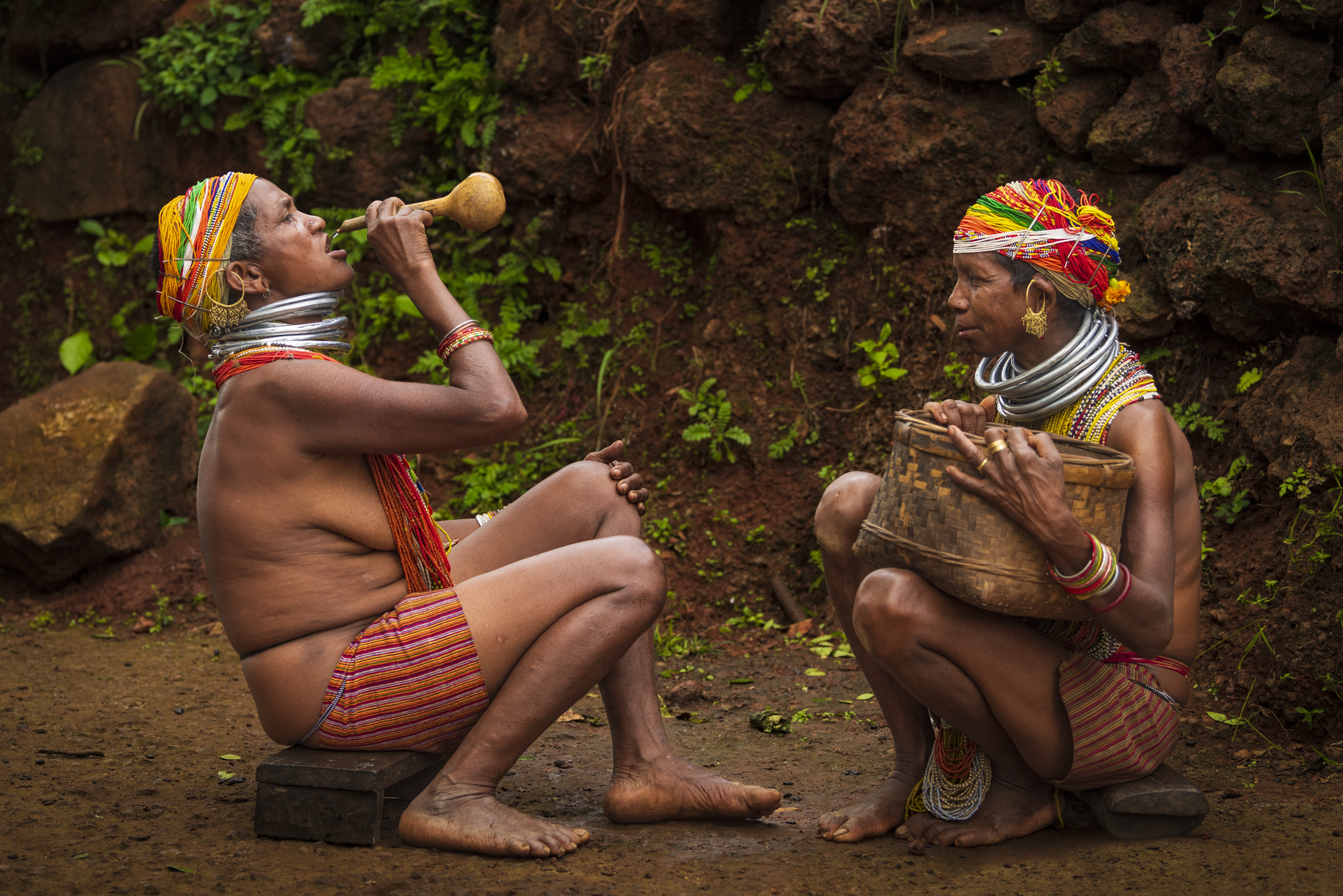
A Bonda tribeswoman drinking pendom.

In Bonda society, the women enjoy a privileged position. They are the primary workers and providers of food for the community. This matriarchal dominance is also seen in the marital norms of the community. Bonda girls largely marry boys who are at least five to ten years younger than them. Thus, the girl looks after her husband as he grows up, and in turn, he cares for his older wife. In contrast with many other populations in India, the number of women among the Bonda greatly exceeds the number of men.

Among the men, alcoholism is a major issue. They spend much time brewing and consuming liquor from rice, palm and the mahua flower. The Bondas are trained in using arms at a young age. This, coupled with rampant alcoholism and their reputation for a quick temper, has contributed to high rates of fratricide among them.

The Bondas still use binnimaya pratha, or barter, and they customarily go to a market every Sunday.

They like to put castor oil on their heads. The women make paintings in their homes.

== Threats to Bonda culture ==
The Government of Odisha has, over the years, tried to bring the Bonda into the mainstream and set up the Bonda Development Agency (BDA) in 1977 with this aim. Outside influences resulted in the Bondas being given new gods. The curriculum in the government school also seeks to inject this process through prayers and songs. The Bonda have begun to take up non traditional occupations as migrant labourers and as peons and clerks in government offices. This process of mainstreaming has however, also had its fallout. Remo or Bonda has approximately 2,500 speakers in the Jayapur hills of Koraput. Despite the large number of speakers of a few Munda languages, bilingualism is widespread. At the present break-neck speed of assimilation, most Munda languages will not survive to the end of this century. All Munda language communities are under heavy demographic and socio-economic pressure to assimilate linguistically to the local Indo-Aryan majority language. The Remo language is now an endangered tongue as more Bondas have taken to Odia as their primary language of communication. The absence of a script or text for Remo adds to the threat of its extinction. It is also feared that other indigenous knowledge of the Bondas will also become casualty to this emphasis on integrating them with Odia society.

In response to the threat of a cyclone on 12 October 2014, roughly 1,300 members of Bonda and Didai tribes living "in different villages under Mudulipada and Andrahal gram panchayats" have been moved to the Tribal Welfare Department, which is managed by the Mudulipada Boys High School on Saturday. About 3,000 more would be moved to other schools and buildings near Bonda Hill if necessary. For those tribes staying in "thatched and kutcha houses" are being moved to cyclone shelters.

== Bibliography ==
- Pancorbo, Luis (2008):"Bonda" en "Avatares. Viajes por la India de los dioses". pp. 147–167. Miraguano Ediciones, Madrid.
- Bhattacharya, S. (1965). "Glottal stop and checked consonants in Bonda". Indo-Iranian Journal. 9 (1): 69–71. doi:10.1163/000000065790086496. JSTOR 24650223. S2CID 162369751.
- Ranjan Sahu, Priya. "Bondas, a Primitive Tribe in Odisha Hills, Get Their First MLA." Points of View Reference Center. Hindustan Times, 24 May 2014. Web. 22 Oct. 2014.
- Pati, Rabindra Nath., and Jagannatha Dash. Tribal and Indigenous People of India: Problems and Prospects. New Delhi: A.P.H. Pub., 2002. Print.
- "Bonda Tribals Shifted to Safety." Access World News. New Indian Express, via HT Media Ltd., 12 Oct. 2014. Web. 20 October 2014.
- van Driem, G. (2007). Endangered Languages of South Asia. Language Diversity Endangered, B. Matthias, ed. Berlin: Mouton de Gruyter, 303–341.
- Pati, Biswamoy (1990). "Koraput: Perceptions in a Changing Society". Economic and Political Weekly. 25 (18/19): 986–988. JSTOR 4396254.
