= Gtaʼ language =

Austroasiatic language

Gta'
- Didayi
- ଡିଡାୟୀ
- Pronunciation: India
- Region: Odisha
- Ethnicity: Didayi
- Native speakers: (3,100 cited 1991 census)
- Language family: Austroasiatic: Munda; South; Gta'
- Writing system: Odia

Language codes
- ISO 639-3: gaq
- Glottolog: gata1239
- ELP: Gta'
- Geta? [sic] is classified as Severely Endangered according to the UNESCO Atlas of the World's Languages in Danger

The Gtaʼ language (also Gataʼ, Gataʔ, and Gtaʔ), also known as Gta Asa, Didei or Didayi ([ɖiɖaːj(i)]), is an Austroasiatic language spoken by the Didayi people of southernmost Odisha in India. It is notable for its sesquisyllabic phonology and vigesimal (base 20) numeral system.

== Classification and dialects ==
The Gtaʼ language belongs to the South Munda subgroup of the Munda branch of the Austroasiatic language family. Within South Munda, Gtaʼ is generally considered to be the first branch off a node that also subsumes the Remo and Gutob languages; this subgroup of South Munda is known as Gutob–Remo–Gataq. It is phonologically and morphologically divergent within that branch.

Gtaʼ has two main varieties, namely Plains Gtaʼ and Hill Gtaʼ.

=== Neighboring languages ===
Gtaʼ echo-formation shows some striking similarities with echo-formation in neighboring Munda languages such as Remo and Gorum as well as in the Desia dialect of Oriya spoken in the Koraput Munda region. The most conspicuous feature they have in common with Gtaʼ is that echo-words in all three of these languages are also derived from base words by changes in the vowels alone.

== Demographics ==
Gtaʼ is spoken by 3,000 people primarily in Malkangiri district, Odisha as well as adjoining areas of Koraput district. According to Anderson (2008), it is spoken by less than 4,500 people.

Ethnologue reports the following locations:

- Odisha (47 villages): Kudumulgumma block and Chitrakonda block of Koraput district and Malkangiri district, south of Bondo Hills; some in Khairput block
- East Godavari district, Andhra Pradesh

== Phonology ==
=== Vowels ===
Gtaʔ has the 5 canonical vowels /a, e, i, o, u/, and sometimes a sixth vowel /æ/. To this can be added several nasalized counterparts: /ã, õ, ũ/ and sometimes /ĩ/.

| | Front | Central | Back |
|---|---|---|---|
| Close | i | (ɨ) (Note: dialectal) | u |
| Mid | e | | o |
| Open | æ/ɛ | a | |

=== Consonants ===
Gtaʔ has the following consonants:

| | | Bilabial | Dental/ Alveolar | Retroflex | Postalv./ Palatal | Velar | Glottal |
|---|---|---|---|---|---|---|---|
| Stop | voiceless | p | t | ʈ | tʃ | k | ʔ |
| Stop | voiced | b | | ɖ | dʒ | ɡ | |
| Fricative | | | s | | | | h |
| Nasal | | m | n | | | ŋ | |
| Approximant | | | l | | (j) | w | |
| Rhotic | | | r | ɽ | | | |

Only /g/ is preglottalized in coda position.

There are numerous lexical items that contain initial consonant clusters and CCVC word shape in Gtaʔ. Eg. plwesa ('jackfruit), gtaʔ ('Gtaʔ person'). The Gtaʔ CCVC structure, with a limited number of consonants permitted in the coda position, has caught the attention of several linguists, since it differs remarkably from most Munda and South Asian word structures from an areal perspective but closely resembles the prototypical Austroasiatic phonological structure in Southeast Asia. All the clusters attested in Gtaʔ are shown in the following table.

Gtaʔ onset clusters
| | p | t | tʃ | k | b | ɖ | dʒ | g | s | h | m | n | ŋ | l | r |
|---|---|---|---|---|---|---|---|---|---|---|---|---|---|---|---|
| p | pp- | | | | | | | | | | mp- | | | | |
| t | | tt- | | | bt- | | | gt- | | | | n-t- | | | |
| ʈ | | | | | bʈ- | | | | | | | | | | |
| tʃ | | | tʃtʃ- | | | | | gtʃ- | | | | ntʃ- | | | |
| k | | | | kk- | bk- | | | | sk- | | | | ŋ-k- | | rk- |
| b | | tb- | | | bb- | ɖb- | | gb- | sb- | | m-b- | | | lb- | rb- |
| ɖ | | | | | ɖb- | ɖɖ- | | gɖ- | sɖ- | | | nɖ- | | | |
| dʒ | | | | | | | dʒdʒ- | gdʒ- | | | | | | ldʒ- | |
| g | | (tg-) | | | | | | gg- | sg- | | | ng- | ŋg- | lg- | |
| s | | | | ks- | bs- | | | gs- | ss- | | | ns- | | ls- | rs- |
| h | | th- | | | | | | gh- | | hh- | | | | lh- | |
| m | | tm- | tʃm- | km- | | | | gm- | sm- | | mm- | | | lm- | |
| n | pn- | tn- | tʃn- | kn- | bn- | ɖn- | dʒn- | gm- | sm- | hn- | mn- | nn- | | ln- | rn- |
| ŋ | | | | | | | | | | | | | | lŋ- | |
| l | pl- | tl- | tʃl- | kl- | bl- | | | gl- | sl- | hl- | ml- | nl- | | ll- | |
| r | pr- | tr- | | kr- | br- | | | gl- | sr- | hr- | mr- | | | | rr- |
| ɽ | pɽ- | | | kɽ- | | | | gɽ- | | hɽ- | | | | | |

== Grammar ==
=== Nouns ===
Nouns in Gtaʼ are primarily marked for case, number and possession.

Nouns also have two forms, one a free full form, the other a bound short form. These latter occur only when the noun is compounded with another noun or a verb for derivational purposes, and are hence labeled "combining forms". The combining form usually involves removing an affix or shortening the noun in some way.

| Free form | Combining form | Gloss |
|---|---|---|
| ncu | -cu- | oil |
| gsi | -si- | louse |
| gbe | -be- | bear |
| gnar | -gar- | bamboo strip |
| remwa | -re- | person |

=== Verb agreement ===
Like Kharia, Gutob and Remo, Gta verbs only index the S and A arguments.

Subject indexation in Gtaʔ
| Subject | Indexed stem |
|---|---|
| 1SG | n-Σ |
| 2SG | na-Σ |
| 1DU.IMP | niʔ-Σ |
| 1PL.INCL | ni-Σ |
| 1PL.EXCL | næ-Σ |
| 2DU | pe-Σ |
| 2PL | pa-Σ |
| 3SG | Ø-Σ |
| 3PL | Ø-Σ-har |

S-V-O transitive configuration has been fossilized with only one survived example: the plural marker -har is used to indicate 1>3 scenario.

gtela næŋ mriaʔ-ce a-mæhiŋ-ke m-bagweʔ-har-e
then I rise-SS OBJ-3PL-OBL 1.SUBJ-kill-PL:1>3.OBJ-FUT
'Then I will get up and kill them all'

=== Voice/version ===
The causative and reciprocal in Gtaʔ manifest as prefixes aʔ- and ho-. Sometimes the reciprocal co-occur with an infixal element -m-, which corresponds to North Munda reciprocal -p-.

me=mwa-ne sle ɖiɖi meʔ=swa n-aʔ-lug-e
one=year-GEN work how one=day 1-CAUS-finish-FUT
'[...]How can I do one year's work in just one day?'

wiŋhaʔ-har=ke ho-m-m-og ho-ʈ-m-u ho-s-m-iʔ ho-s-m-aʔ-har=ke
quarrel-PL=PST RECP-beat/RECP/ RECP-throw.stone/RECP/ RECP-cut/RECP/ RECP-catch/RECP/-PL=PST
'They beat each other, threw stones at each other, caught and butchered each other.'

=== Echo formation ===
Gtaʔ is also notable for its use of echo words. There are four broad categories of echo forms:

- a-forms, indicating gross variety;
- i-forms, indicating diminutive or tender variety;
- u/a-forms, indicating variety different from a related category;
- partially changed forms, indicating inferior variety: a-forms, indicating grossness; and i-forms, indicating tenderness.

The phonological rules for deriving one type of echo word are as follows:

1. Echo-words are formed by changing only the vowels of the base word.
2. The echo-word must differ from the base word. The vowel of univocalic base words is reflected as either /a/ or /i/ in the echo-word. For base-word /u, e, o/ the vowel /a/ is preferred, while for base word /ɛ/ the vowel /i/ is preferred.
3. The vowels of disyllabic base words are reflected in the echo-word as follows:
  - Both vowels are reflected as either /a/ or /i/; or
  - Only one of the base-word vowels is reflected as /a/ or /i/ while the other is reflected unchanged; or
  - The first vowel (V1) changes to /u/ while the second (V2) changes to /a/.
4. In the case of trisyllabic base words, one, two or all three of the vowels (in adjacent syllables) are reflected as either /a/ or /i/.
5. The echo-forms of compound words, irrespective of their vocalic structure, are derived as follows:
  - In the case of compound verbs consisting of two verb stems, one or both stems undergo change, depending on their relationship with each other;
  - Nominal combining forms occurring with verb stems change independently; those attached to noun stems change only at par with the main stem.
  - In verbal constructions incorporating a prefix, both the prefix and the stem change as a unit.

Combining forms of nouns occurring with verb stems can be echoed independently of the verb stems; those occurring with noun stems either remain intact or change at par with the main stems.

=== Switch reference ===
Gtaʔ has two switch reference markers, tʃe (same subject) and la (different subject) to link the finite verb of the preceding clause with the non-finite verb of the following clause. This system reflects in Gtaʔ narrative style of oral folk stories.

ɖukri hoʔru=hoʔria-tʃe swa e-r'ro-ran-tʃe handa-ndoe-ne mor-ke tʃwar-tʃe aʔ-nswar-bo-ke
old.woman weep=ECHO-SS fire ~go.carry-bring-SS husband-3.REF-GEN corpse-OBL dry-SS CAUS-dry-keep-ke.PST
'the old woman wept a lot and then made a fire, dried up her husband's corpse and preserved it'

mæ-pa mba-ya hara-hari ɖin-tʃe koɖa pwetur-æg-har-ke
he-DU two-person defeat-ECHO AUX-SS mountain surround-shit-PL-PST
'The two of them trying to beat each other, went around the mountain shitting.'

hɽiŋ oʔɽi=mwa sgwa we-la ɖokra gweʔ=we-ge
later.on how.much=year like go-DS old.man die=AUX-PST
'later on, after like several years passed, the man died'

== Numeral system ==
Gta' numeral system is vigesimal.

| 1. muiŋ | 21. mũikuɽi muiŋ / ekustɔra |
| 2. mbar | 22. mũikuɽi mbar |
| 3. ɲji | 23. mũikuɽi ɲji |
| 4. õ | 24. mũikuɽi hõ |
| 5. malʷe | 25. mũikuɽi malikliɡˀ |
| 6. tur | 26. mũikuɽi turukliɡˀ |
| 7. ɡul | 27. mũikuɽi gukliɡˀ |
| 8. tma / aʈʈa | 28. mũikuɽi tomakliɡˀ / mũikuɽi tma |
| 9. sontiŋ / nɔʈa | 29. mũikuɽi sontiŋkliɡˀ |
| 10. ɡʷa / dɔsʈa | 30. mũikuɽi ɡʷa (20 + 10) / tirisʈa |
| 11. ɡʷamiŋ / eɡaʈa | |
| 12. ɡombar / baroʈa | |
| 13. ɡoɲji / teroʈa | |
| 14. ɡohõ / coudoʈa | 40. mbarkuɽi (2 × 20) / calistɔra |
| 15. ɡomal / pɔndrɔʈa | 50. mbarkuɽi ɡʷa / pɔcas |
| 16. ɡotur / soloːʈa | 60. ɲjikuɽi (3 × 20) / saʈe |
| 17. ɡogu / sɔtroʈa | 70. ɲjikuɽi ɡʷa / suturi |
| 18. ɡotma / aʈɾa | 80. ōkuɽi (4 × 20) |
| 19. ɡososiŋ / unisʈa | 90. ōkuɽi ɡʷa |
| 20. ɡosolɡa / kuɽitɔra / kuɽeta | 100. malkuɽi (5 × 20) / soetɔra |

== Sources ==
- Anderson, Gregory D.S. (2008). "Gtaʔ.". In Gregory D.S. Anderson (ed.). The Munda Languages. Routledge Language Family Series. London / New York: Routledge. pp. 682–763.
