= Malkangiri district =

- District of Odisha
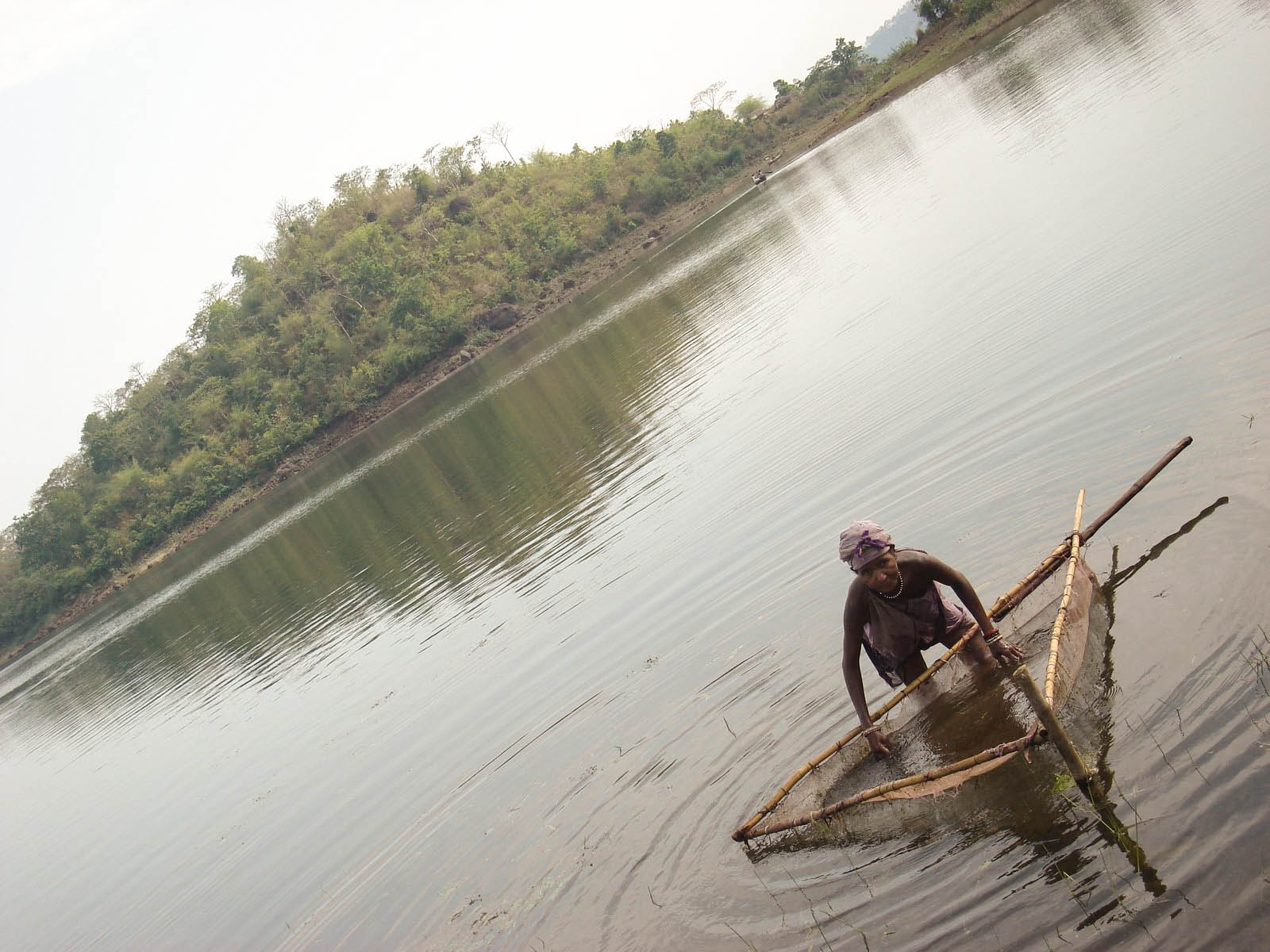
- Balimela Reservoir

- Location in Odisha
- Coordinates: 18.25°N 82.13°E
- Country: India
- State: Odisha
- Headquarters: Malkangiri

Government
  - Collector & District Magistrate: Somesh Upadhyay, IAS
  - Superintendent of Police: H Vinoth Patil, IPS

Area
  - Total: 5,791 km^{2} (2,236 sq mi)
- Elevation: 195 m (640 ft)

Population (2011)
  - Total: 613,192
  - Density: 83/km^{2} (210/sq mi)

Languages
  - Official: Odia
  - Regional: Desiya, Koya, Kuvi, Gutob, Halbi
- Time zone: UTC+5:30 (IST)
- PIN: 764 xxx
- Vehicle registration: OD-30
- Sex ratio: 1.004 ♂/♀
- Literacy: 49.49%
- Lok Sabha constituency: Nabarangpur(ST)
- Vidhan Sabha constituency: 2: 146-Malkangiri(ST) 147-Chitrakonda(ST)
- Climate: Aw (Köppen)
- Precipitation: 1,700 millimetres (67 in)
- Avg. summer temperature: 47 °C (117 °F)
- Avg. winter temperature: 13 °C (55 °F)
- Website: malkangiri.nic.in

Malkangiri district is the southwesternmost district in the Indian state of Odisha. It has two Vidhan sabha constituencies. The district headquarters is Malkangiri.

== History ==
Local legend claims that Valmiki wrote the Ramayana on the banks of the Tamasa river. The region was known as Malyavantagiri in the Ramayana, and Sitakunda, near Mudulipada was believed to have been the bathing place of Sita. Local legend also claims the Pandavas spent a year in exile in the dense forests of Malkangiri. Kanamraju, Balaraju and Poturaju are the three famous Lords of this area, who are worshipped by the people. On every alternative year, Badayatra, the festival of these Lords is celebrated throughout the district.

Prior to 1936, Malkangiri was part of Koraput district of the Madras Presidency. In 1936, Koraput District became part of Odisha and Malkangiri Tahasil was included in Koraput District. This Tahasil was a part of Nawarangpur sub-division of Koraput District. On 1 January 1962, Malkangiri subdivision was carved out. In 1958, refugees from East Pakistan were settled in the area in the Dandakaranya Project. This project continued for 30 years until it was declared closed in 1988.

Finally, on 2 October 1992, Malkangiri was carved out of Koraput District. Today, the district has become known as a hotbed of Maoist activity.

== Administrative setup ==
There are 07 Blocks and 07 Tahasils under one Sub-Division in Malkangiri district are listed in the following table.

#	07 Blocks	07 Tahasils
1	Malkangiri	Malkangiri
2	Mathili	Mathili
3	Khairput	Khairput
4	Chitrakonda	Chitrakonda
5	Korukonda	Kudumulgumma
6	Kalimela	Kalimela
7	Podia	Motu

There are 12 Police Stations under two Police Sub-Divisions in Malkangiri district are listed in the following table.

	Malkangiri Police Sub-Division	Chitrakonda Police Sub-Division
1	Malkangiri P.S.	Chitrakonda P.S.
2	Mathili P.S.	Mudulipada P.S.
3	Podia P.S.	Orkel P.S.
4	Kalimela P.S.	Jodamba P.S.
5	M.V. 79 P.S.	Papermetla P.S.
6	Motu P.S.	
7	Energy P.S., Malkangiri	

== Economy ==
In 2006 the Ministry of Panchayati Raj named Malkangiri one of the country's 250 most backward districts (out of a total of 640). It is one of the 19 districts in Odisha currently receiving funds from the Backward Regions Grant Fund Programme (BRGF).

== Demographics ==
Historical population
Year	Pop.	±%
1901	58,275	—
1911	70,059	+20.2%
1921	67,874	−3.1%
1931	80,047	+17.9%
1941	94,894	+18.5%
1951	106,637	+12.4%
1961	141,955	+33.1%
1971	268,865	+89.4%
1981	335,169	+24.7%
1991	422,326	+26.0%
2001	504,198	+19.4%
2011	613,192	+21.6%
Source: Census of India

Religions in Malkangiri district (2011)
Religion	Percent
Hinduism	97.88%
Christianity	1.64%
Other or not stated	0.48%

According to the 2011 census Malkangiri district has a population of 613,192, roughly equal to the nation of Solomon Islands or the US state of Vermont. This gives it a ranking of 523rd in India (out of a total of 640). The district has a population density of 106 inhabitants per square kilometre (270/sq mi). Its population growth rate over the decade 2001-2011 was 21.53%. Malkangiri has a sex ratio of 1016 females for every 1000 males, and a literacy rate of 49.49%. 8.08% of the population lives in urban areas. Scheduled Castes and Scheduled Tribes make up 22.55% and 57.83% of the population respectively.

Languages of Malkangiri district (2011)
1. Odia (34.1%)
2. Koya (23.4%)
3. Bengali (21.5%)
4. Desiya (4.18%)
5. Telugu (2.97%)
6. Kuvi (2.59%)
7. Bhuiyan (1.99%)
8. Proja (1.72%)
9. Halbi (1.36%)
10. Others (6.25%)

At the time of the 2011 Census of India, 34.06% of the population in the district spoke Odia, 23.40% Koya, 21.48% Bengali, 4.18% Desia, 2.97% Telugu, 2.59% Kuvi, 1.99% Bhuiyan, 1.72% Proja and 1.36% Halbi as their first language. There are several other languages spoken in the district including Remo and Gta', this last language spoken by the Didayi people. The Bengali language is mostly spoken by descendants of refugees from Bangladesh erst while East Pakistan. The Odia Language is the dominant language with its dialects Desia and Paraja.

== Politics ==
=== Vidhan sabha constituencies ===
Malkangiri has 2 Vidhan Sabha constituencies, electing members to the Odisha Legislative Assembly:
