= Agariya =

Agariya may refer to:

- Agariya people
- Agariya language
- Agariya, Bhopal, a village in Madhya Pradesh
