= Agariya, Bhopal =

Agariya
- village
- Location within Madhya Pradesh Location within India
- Coordinates: 23.4030005°N 77.4529868°E
- Country: India
- State: Madhya Pradesh
- District: Bhopal
- Tehsil: Huzur
- Elevation: 471 m (1,545 ft)

Population (2011)
  - Total: 1,078
- Time zone: UTC+5:30 (IST)
- ISO 3166 code: MP-IN
- 2011 census code: 482404

Agariya is a village in the Bhopal district of Madhya Pradesh, India. It is located in the Huzur tehsil and the Phanda block.

== Demographics ==
According to the 2011 census of India, Agariya has 219 households. The effective literacy rate (i.e. the literacy rate of population excluding children aged 6 and below) is 67.95%.

Demographics (2011 Census)
	Total	Male	Female
Population	1078	563	515
Children aged below 6 years	170	91	79
Scheduled caste	703	366	337
Scheduled tribe	25	11	14
Literates	617	366	251
Workers (all)	431	268	163
Main workers (total)	384	244	140
Main workers: Cultivators	190	117	73
Main workers: Agricultural labourers	175	113	62
Main workers: Household industry workers	1	1	0
Main workers: Other	18	13	5
Marginal workers (total)	47	24	23
Marginal workers: Cultivators	6	4	2
Marginal workers: Agricultural labourers	37	18	19
Marginal workers: Household industry workers	1	0	1
Marginal workers: Others	3	2	1
Non-workers	647	295	352
