= Bengal temple architecture =

Temple styles in Bengal

Bengal temple architecture also known as Malla dynasty architecture is about temple styles developed and used in Bengal, particularly the deul, chala, ratna and dalan temples.

== Background ==
Both eoigraphic evidences and literary sources hint at the existence of numerous temples in Bengal. Foreign travellers like Fa Hien, Hiuen Tsang noticed a large number of monasteries, temples and stupas in different parts of Bengal.

According to David J. McCutchion historically the religious architecture in Bengal may be divided into three periods: the early Hindu period dominated by the Pala & Sena dynasties (up to the end of the 12th century, or may be a little later in certain areas), the Sultanate period (14th to early 16th century), and the Hindu revival period beginning with the Mughal conquest (16th to 19th century). "The coming of the Muslims at the beginning of the 13th century marked a sharp break with the past. After an initial century or so of anarchy and consolidation ... Bengal as we know it today became an independent entity for the first time. During the following two centuries a distinctive Bengali culture took shape".

"Between the earlier and later Hindu periods astonishing religious changes took place in Bengal: the worship of Vishnu gave way to that of Radha Krishna of Chamunda to that of Kali; Surya fell entirely out of favour; curious folk cults like that of Dharmathakur or Dakshin Rai arose." The temples of pre-Muslim period can be called tall curvilinear rekha deul. Another equally common group of temples found in Pre-Mughal Bengal are temples with tiered pyramidal tower can be described as pirha or bhadra deul. During the earlier and later Hindu period the religious changes in Bengal introduced some changes in the temple architecture. In their places of the other temple styles two completely new styles developed - hut style and the pinnacled style.

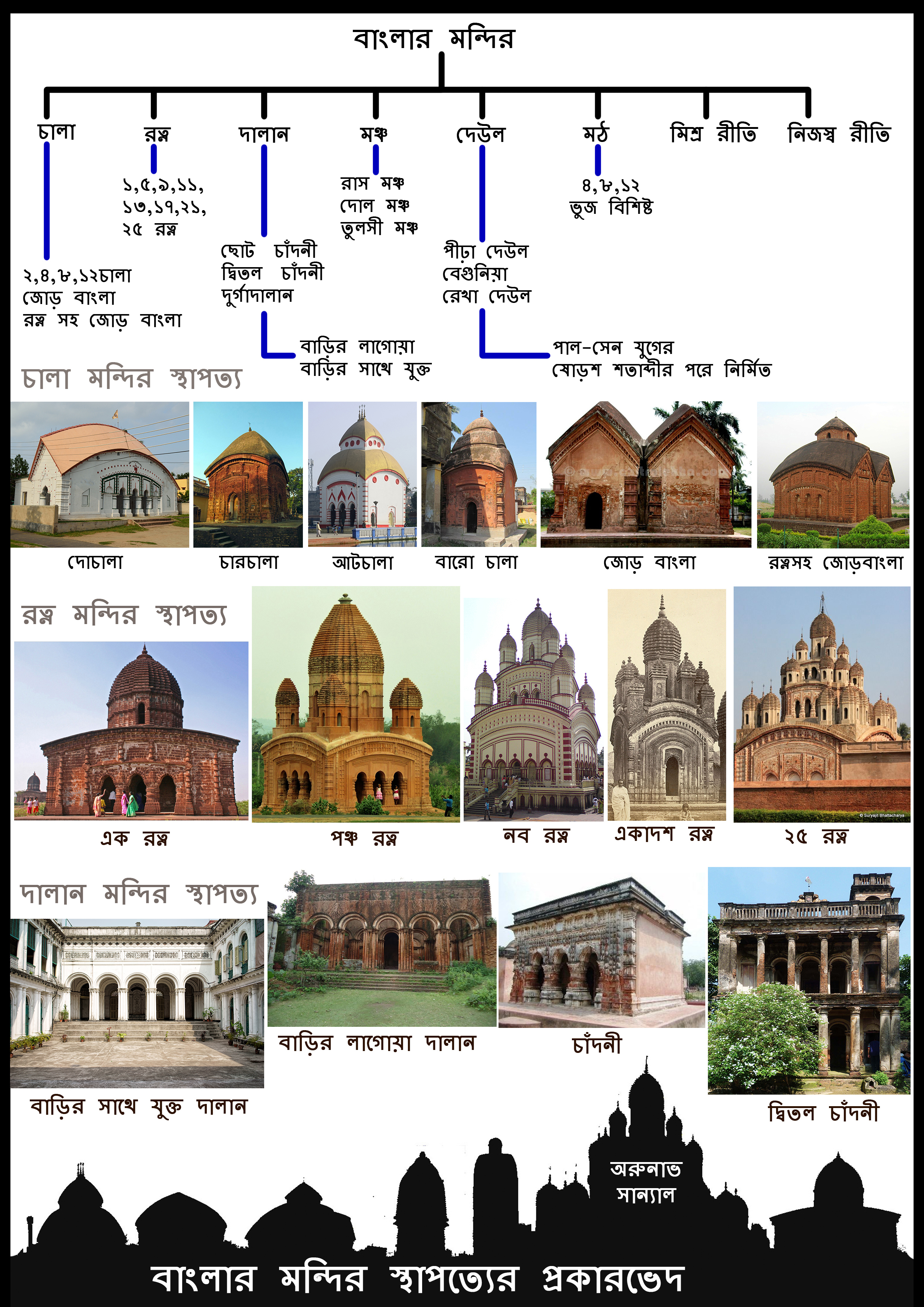
Classification of Bengal Temple Architecture

== Rekha deul ==
The rekha deul was the predominant form of temple architecture in Bengal during the pre Islamic period. According to David J. McCutchion, this type of temple achieved its standard initial form in central India and was spread to different places which included Bengal. The features of this type temple are "smooth curvilinear" and "ridged curvilinear." In the smooth type, the sikhara is free of horizontal bars and in ridged type, it is closely ridged with bars. The ratha projections are generally deep and spaced, and sometimes decorated. The crowning amalaka is generally large and flat. There are large and small types of deuls. Many of the very small types dispense with the complicated styling. It went on developing from the late 7 th century or early 8 th century to around the 19 th century, increasing its complexity and height but retaining its basic features.

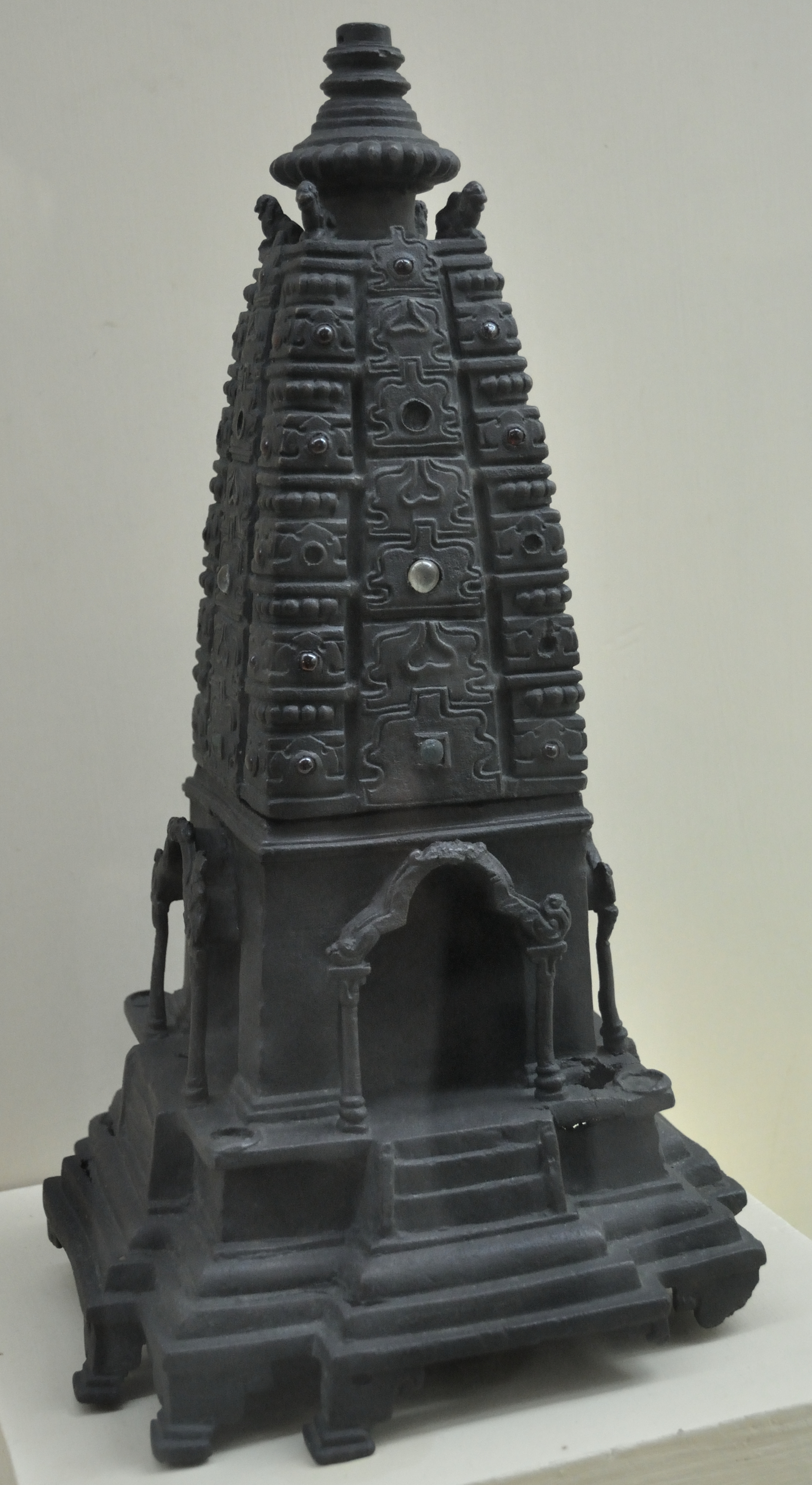
Bronze miniature temple model from Chittagong District, Bangladesh, 7th century. Currently at Indian Museum

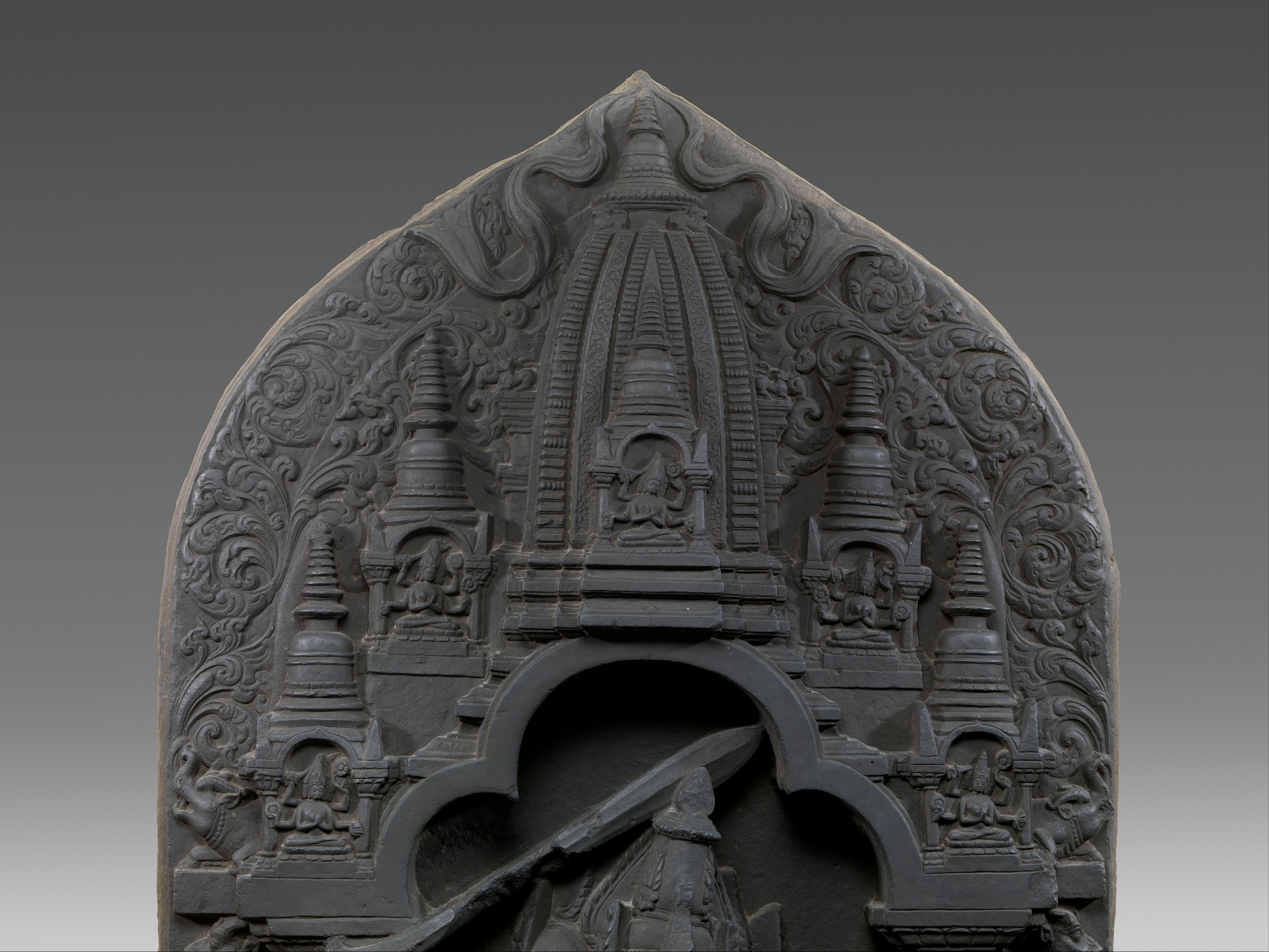
11th century relief of a temple sikhara (in centre) flanked by stupas featured in an arch adoring Manjushri from Bengal. Currently at Metropolitan Museum of Art

Barakar temples at Barakar in Paschim Bardhaman district. Photograph by Joseph David Beglar in 1897. Possibly, the earliest rekha deuls still standing.

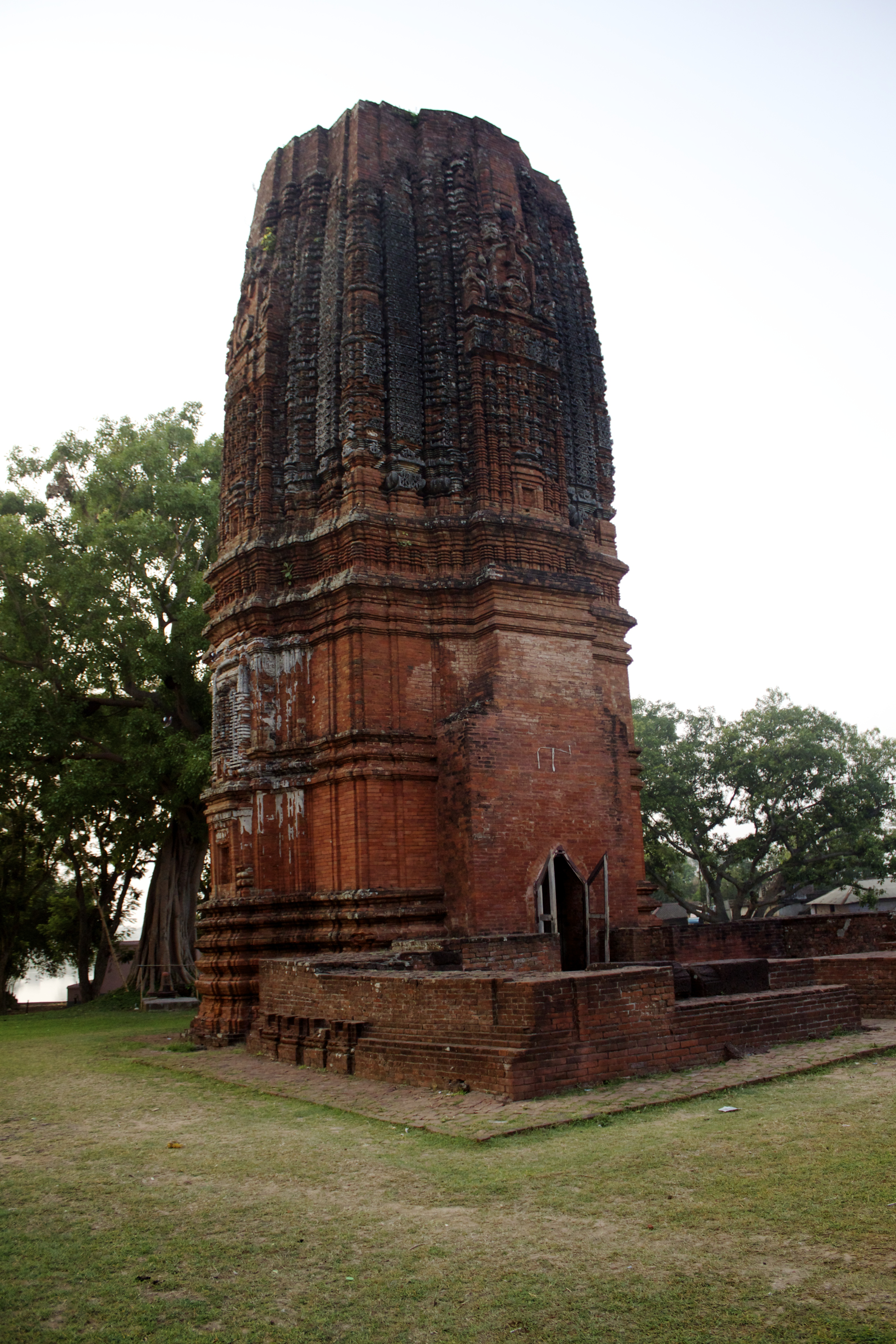
Bahulara Ancient Temple, Bankura district, 8th-11th century

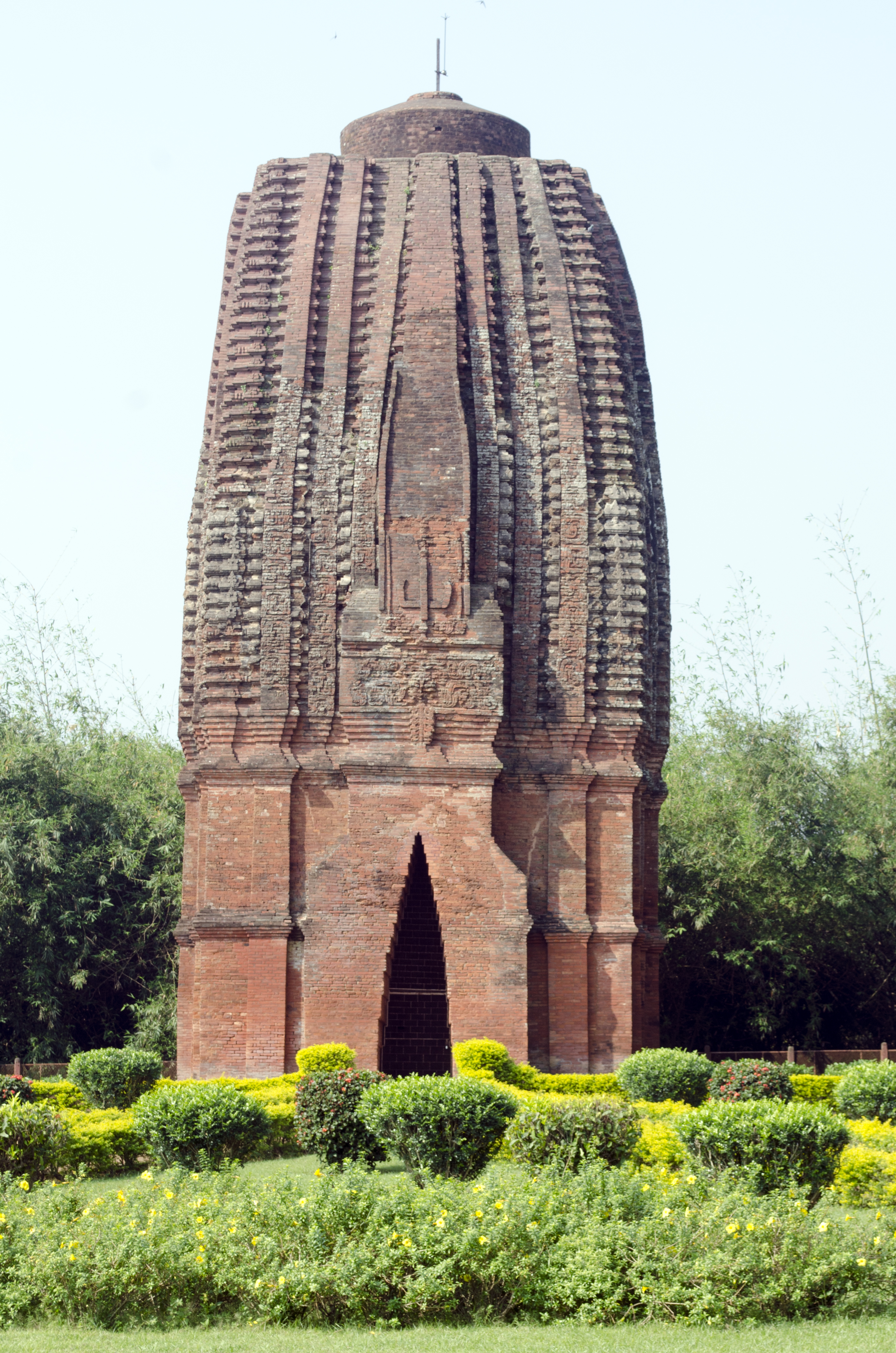
Sat Deul, Purba Bardhaman district, 10th century

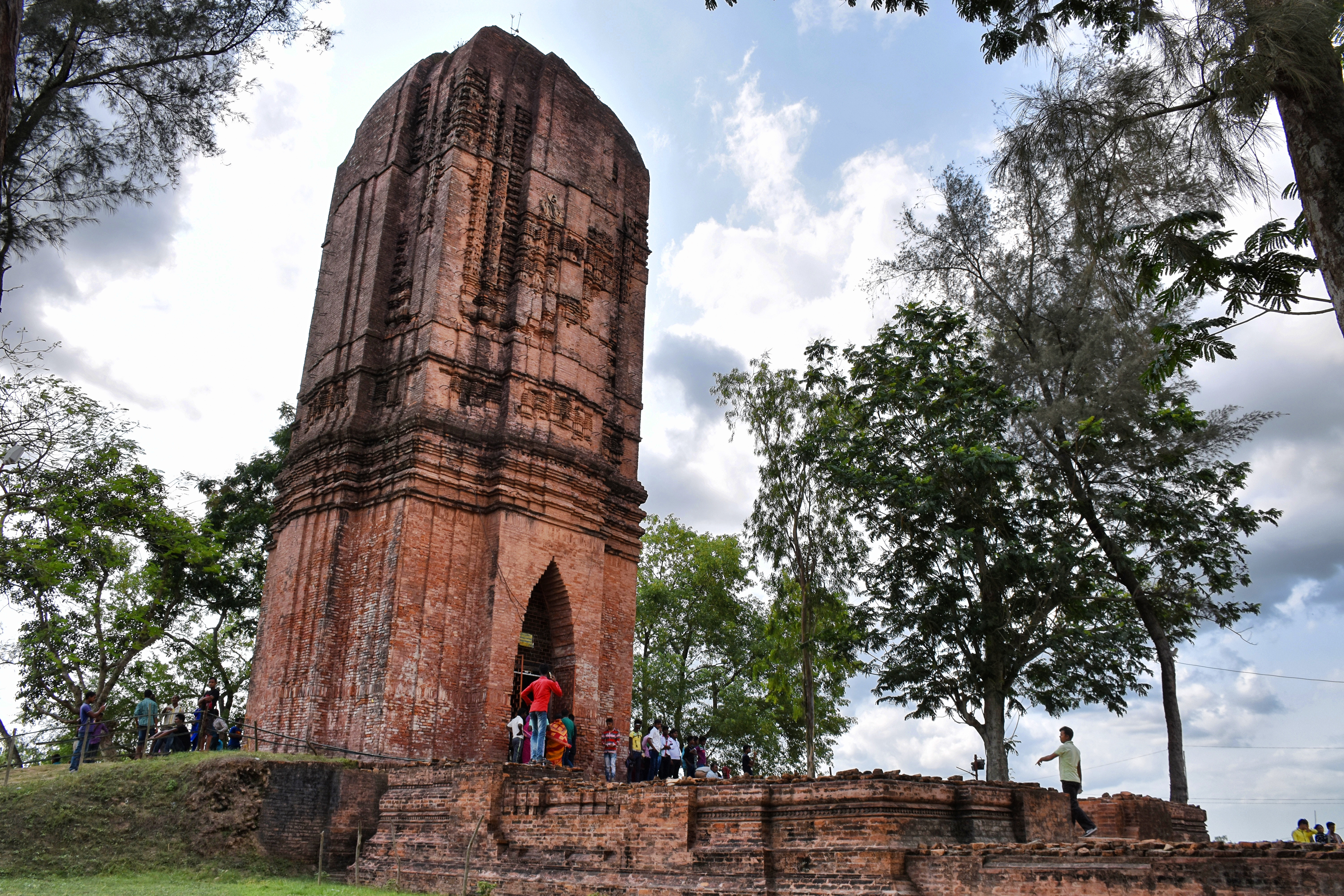
Jatar Deul, South 24 Parganas, 11th century

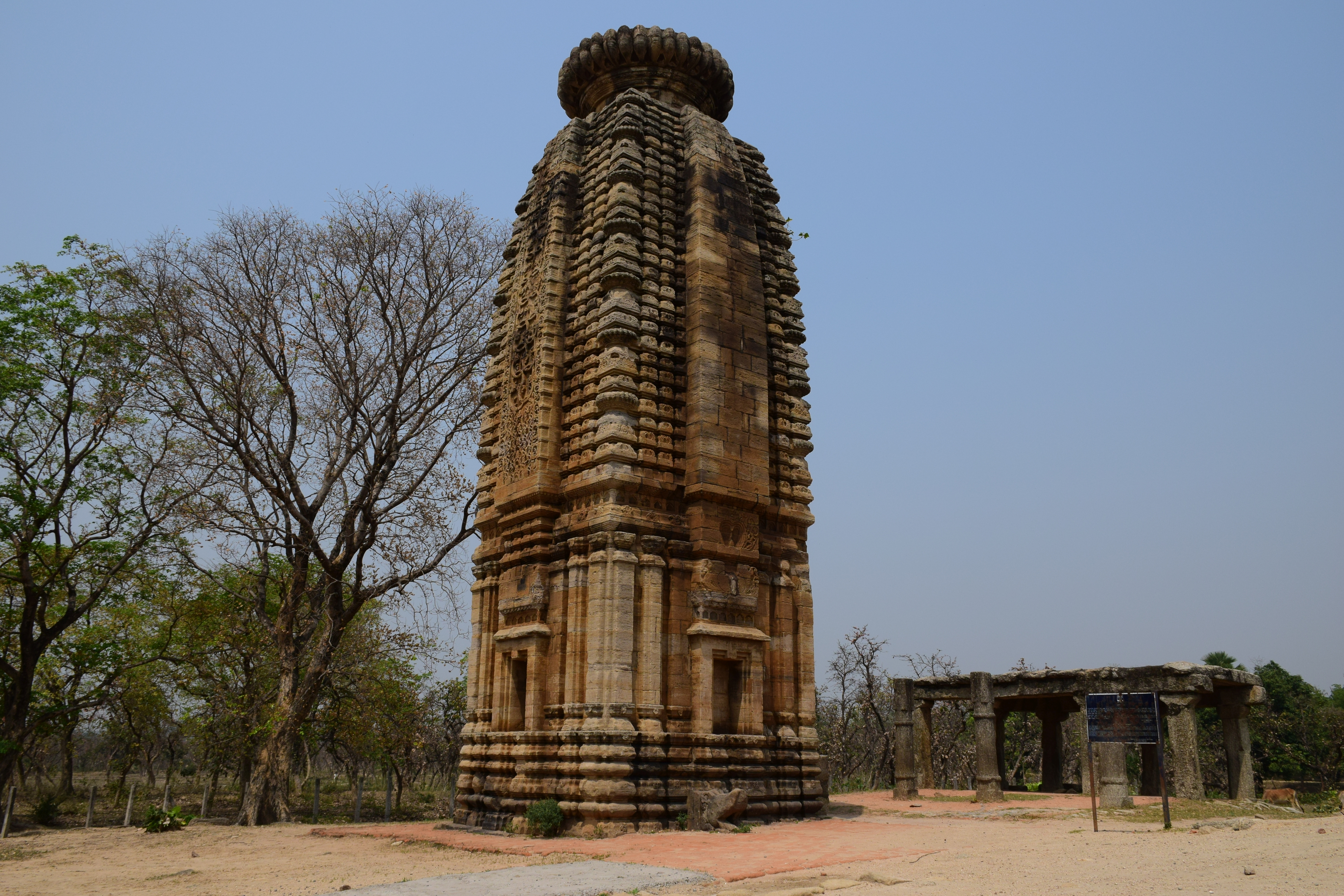
Banda Deul, Purulia district, 11th century

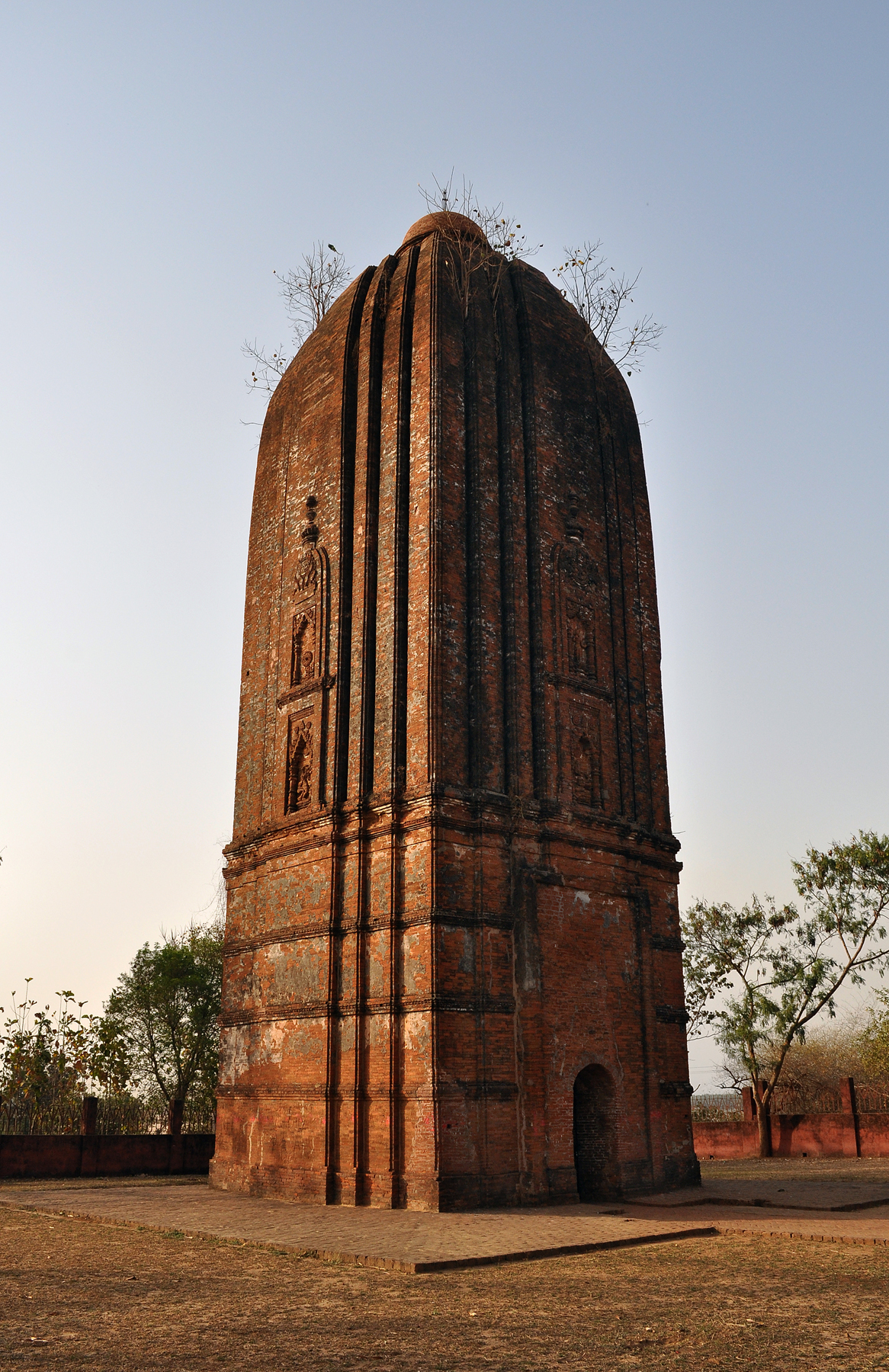
Ichhai Ghosher Deul at Gourangapur, Paschim Bardhaman district, 16-17th century

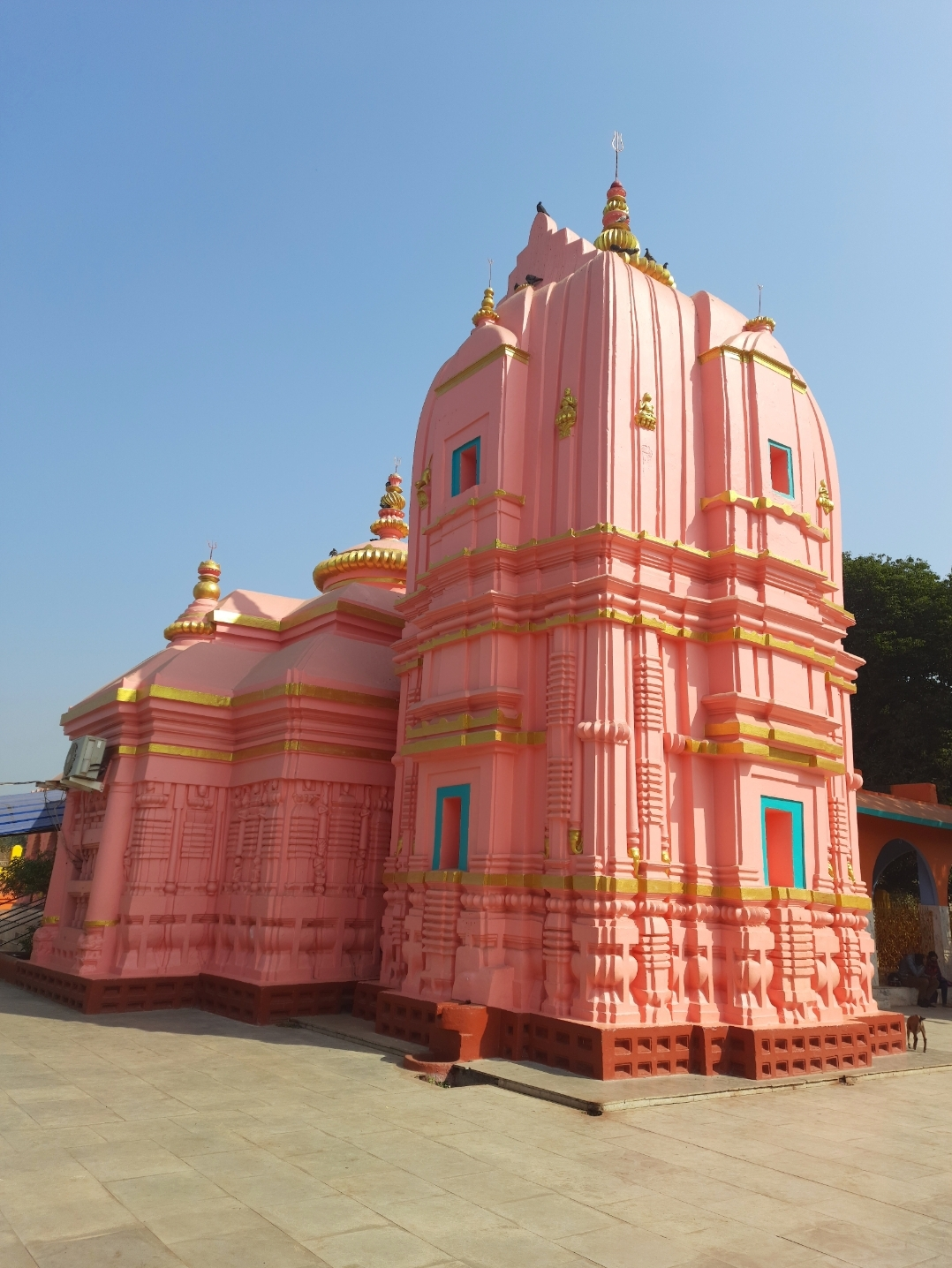
Sarbamangala Temple, Garbeta, Paschim Medinipur district, West Bengal. 16th century

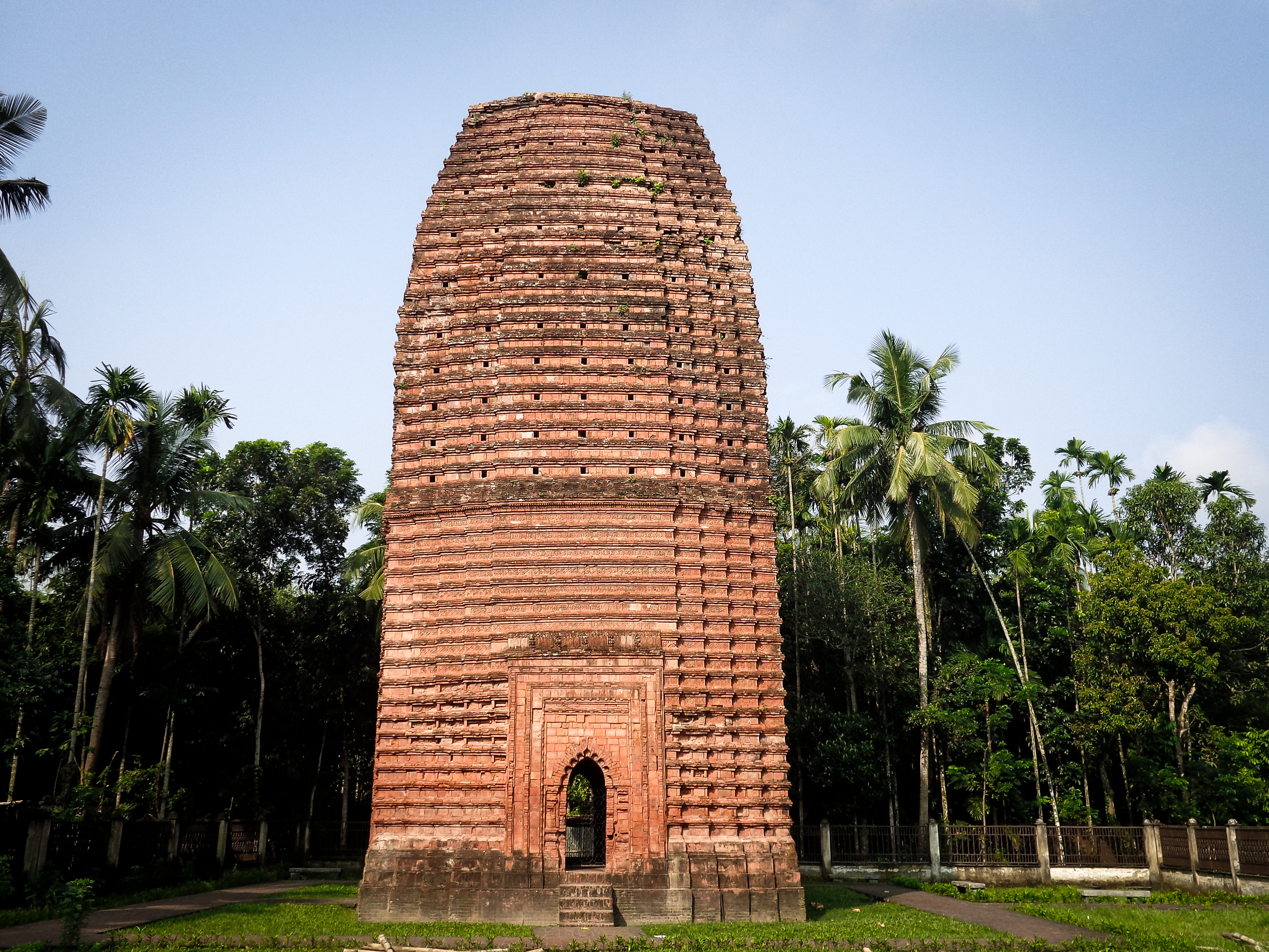
Kodla Math in Bagerhat, Khulna, Bangladesh. 17th century

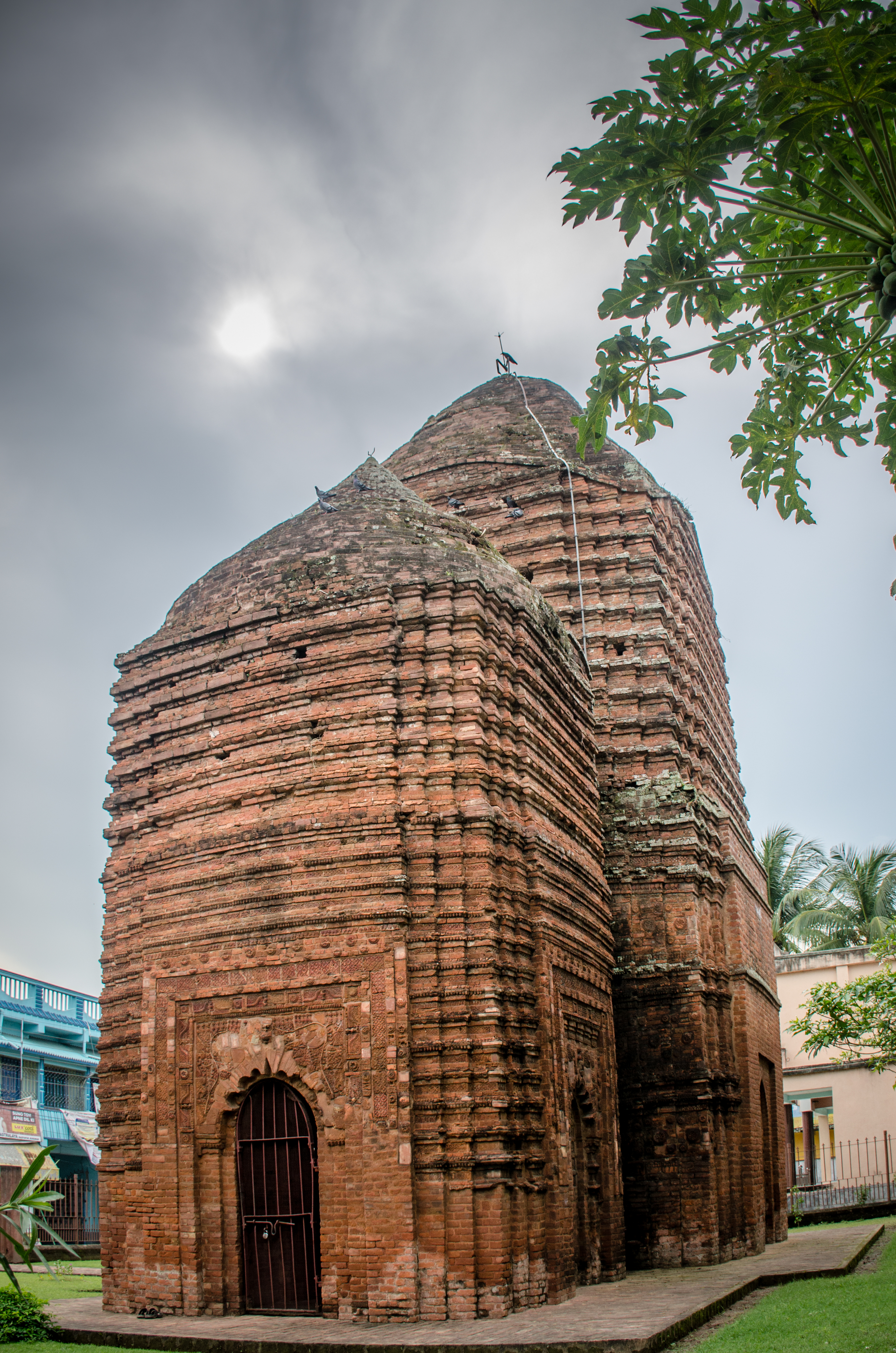
Baidyapur Twin temples

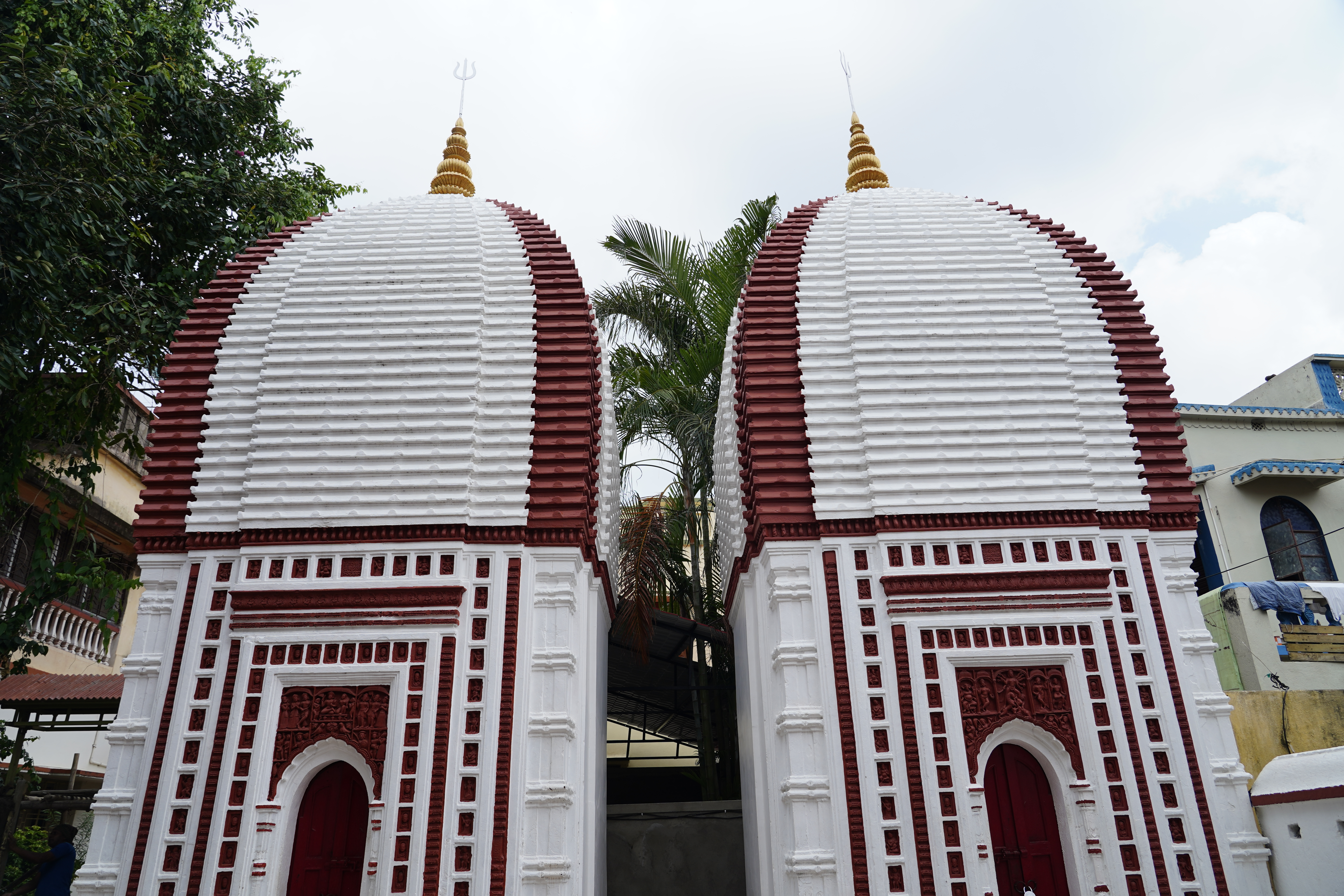
Jora Deul built in 1831

== Chala temple ==
The ek-bangla or do-chala consists of a brick-built structure resembling rural mud huts with two sloping roofs, resembling thatched straw roofs of Bengali villages. The stone temple at Garui in Bardhaman district of West Bengal, built in the 14th century, has a Bengal hut shaped roof. Two huts, one forming a porch in front and the other being the shrine at the back constitutes the jor-bangla design – "Bengal's most distinctive contribution to temple architecture".

In West Bengal, the hut roof generally has four sides and the char-chala temple is built on this model. If a miniature duplicate is built on the roof, it becomes an at-chala. The char-chala temple form was well established by the 16 th -17 th century. Perhaps the earliest char chala temple in Bengal dates back to 15 th century.

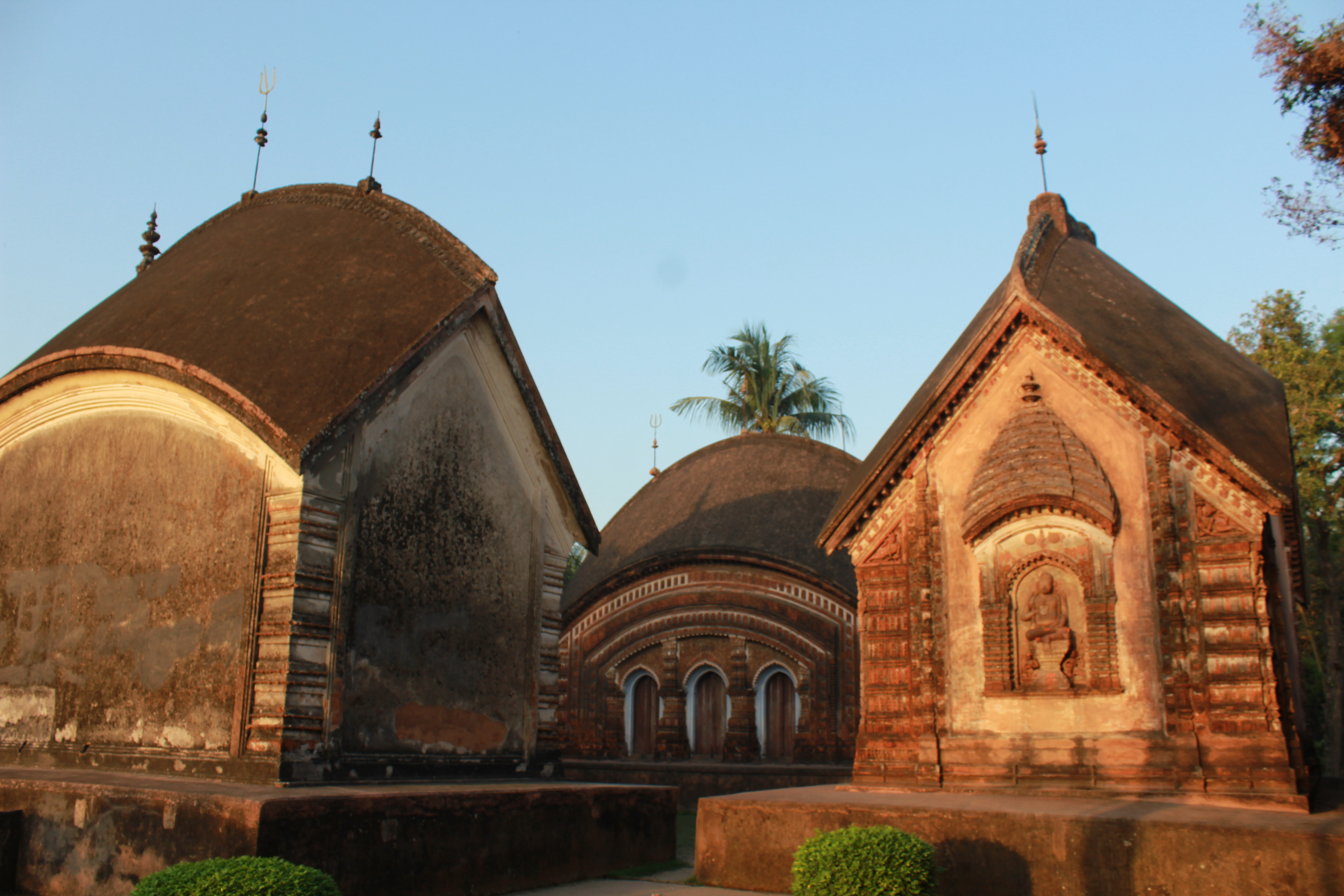
Char Bangla group of temples at Baranagar in Murshidabad district are examples of ek-bangla temples

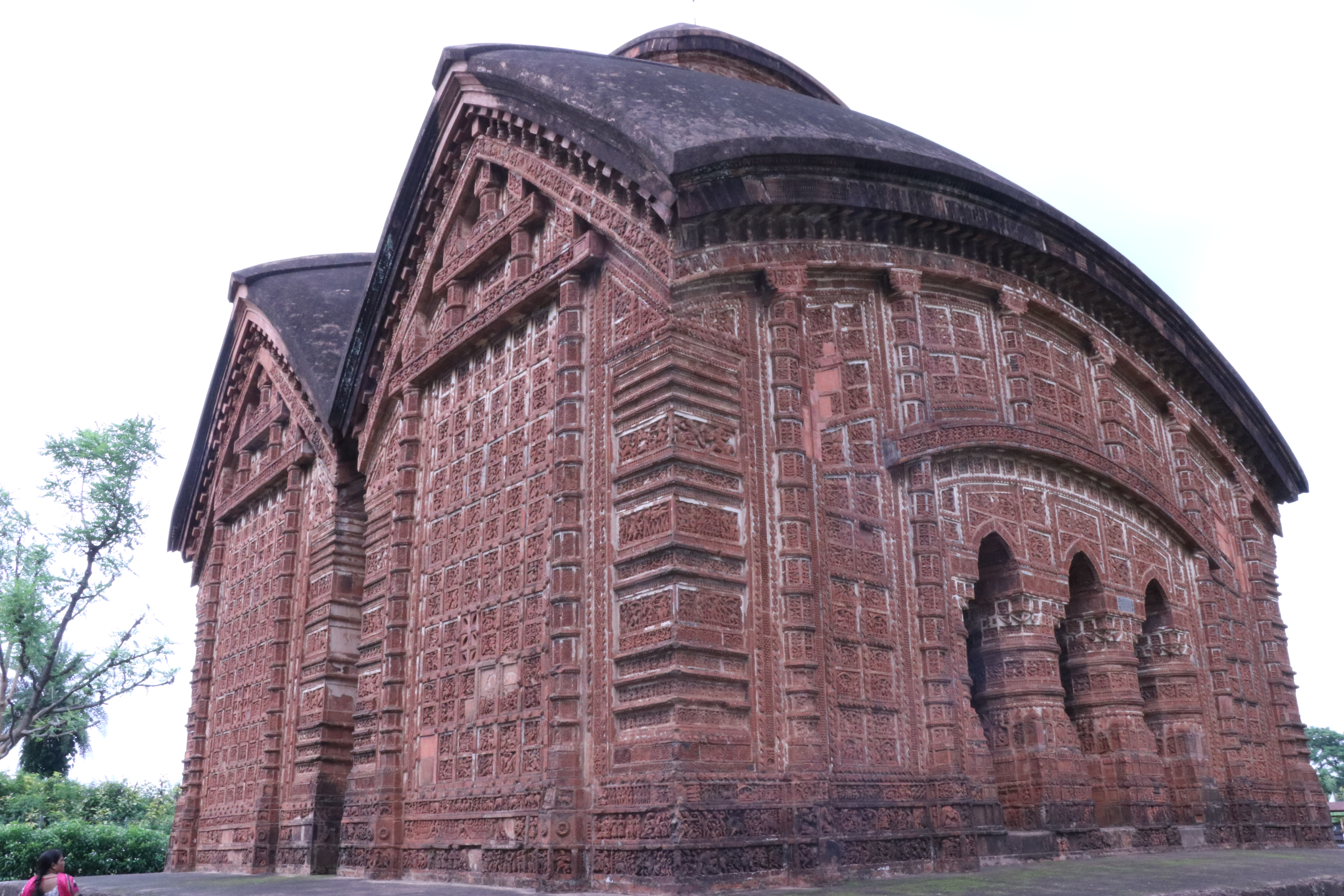
Jor Bangla temple at Bishnupur, Bankura district

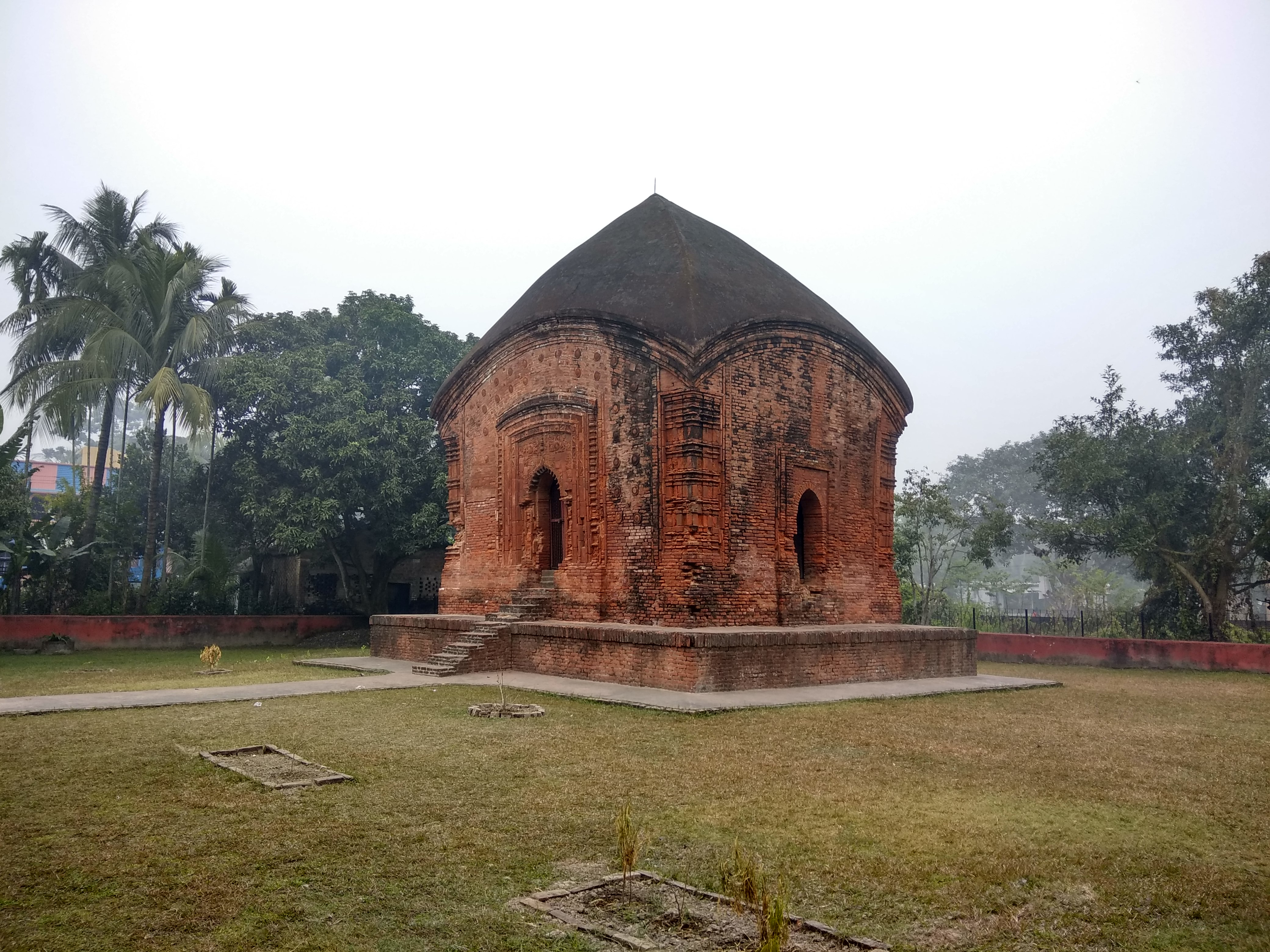
Char-chala temple at Palpara, Nadia district

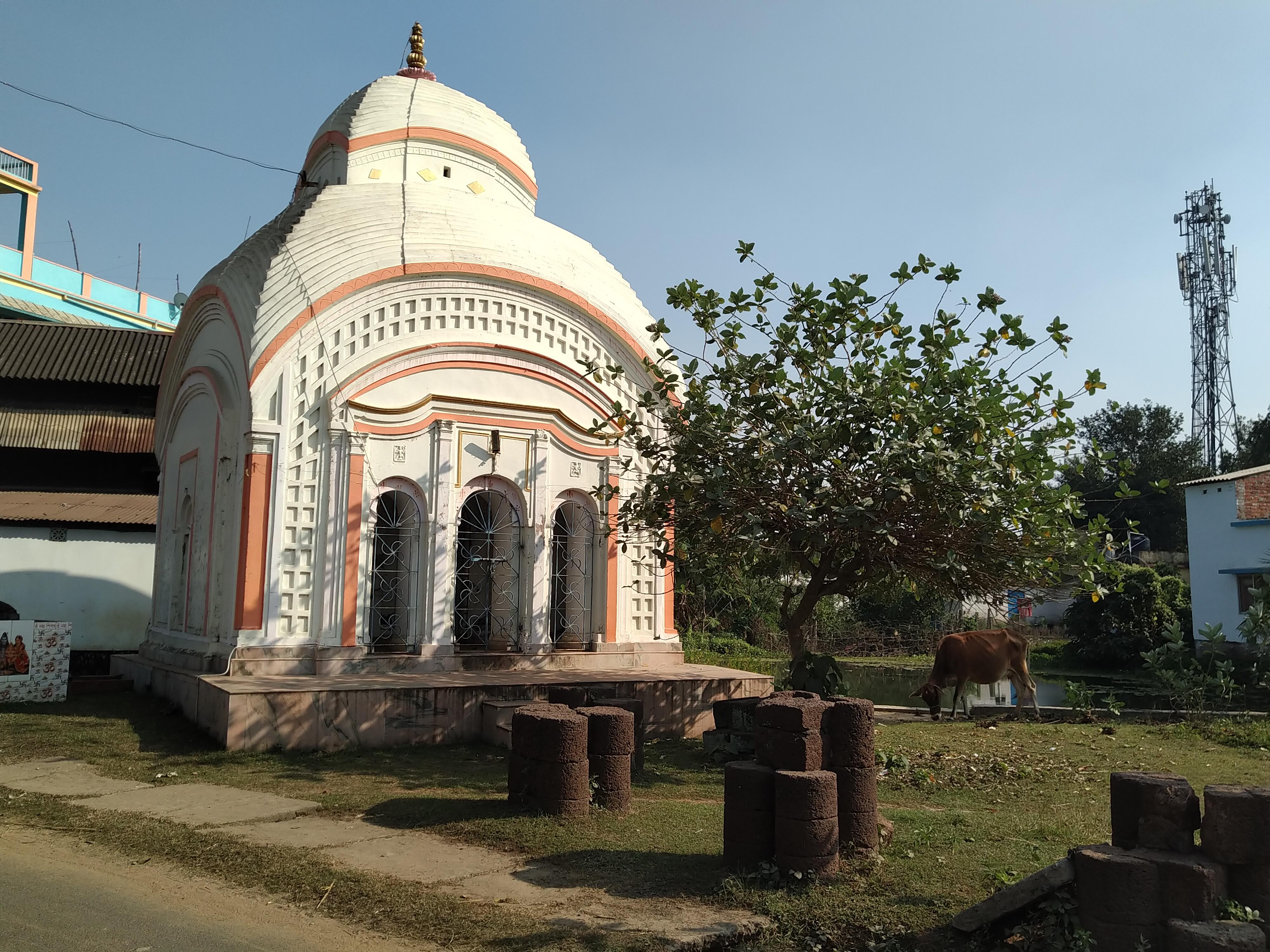
At-chala Shantinath temple at Chandrakona, Paschim Medinipur district

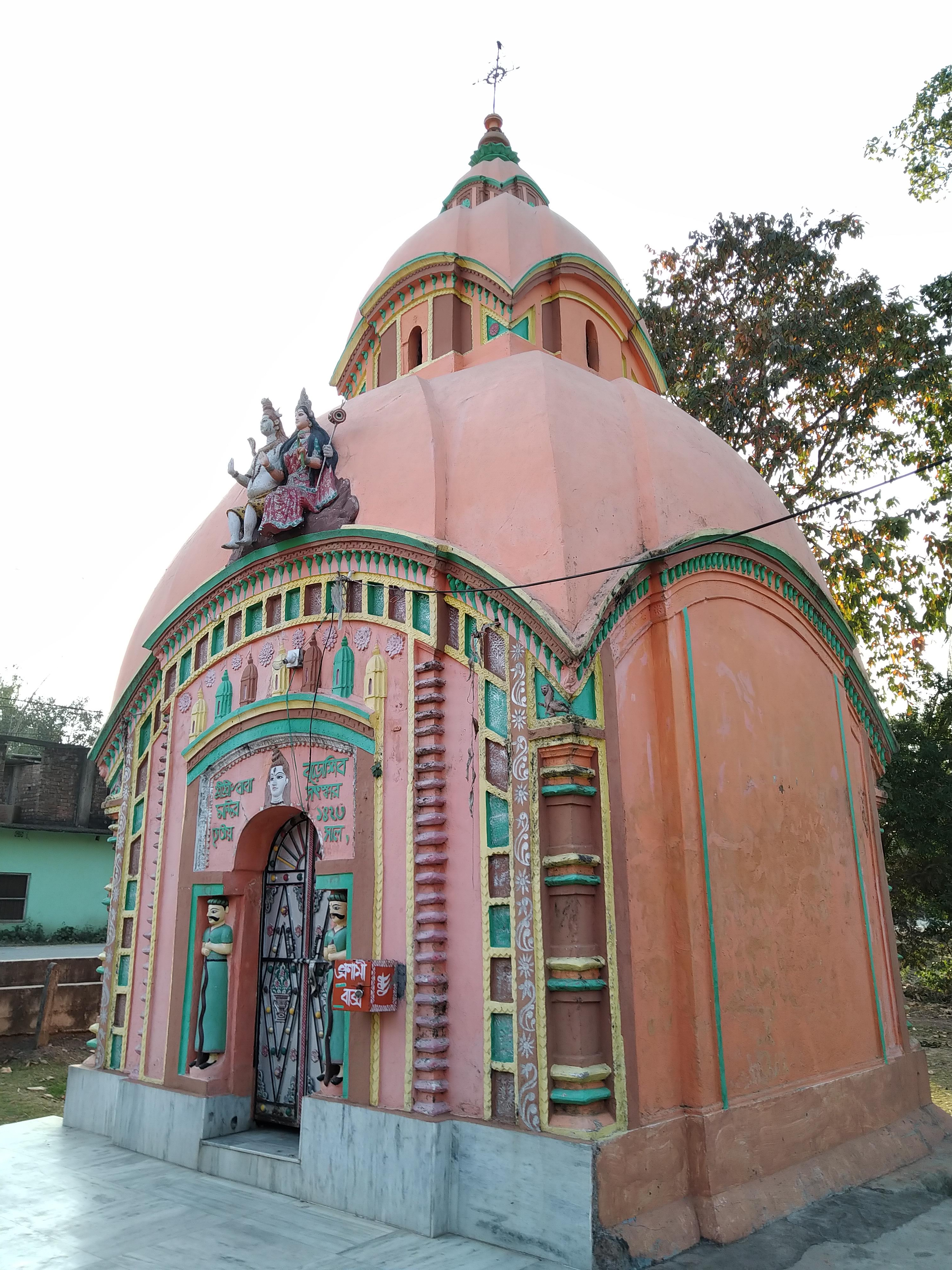
Baro-chala Buro Shiva temple at Jalshara, Paschim Medinipur district

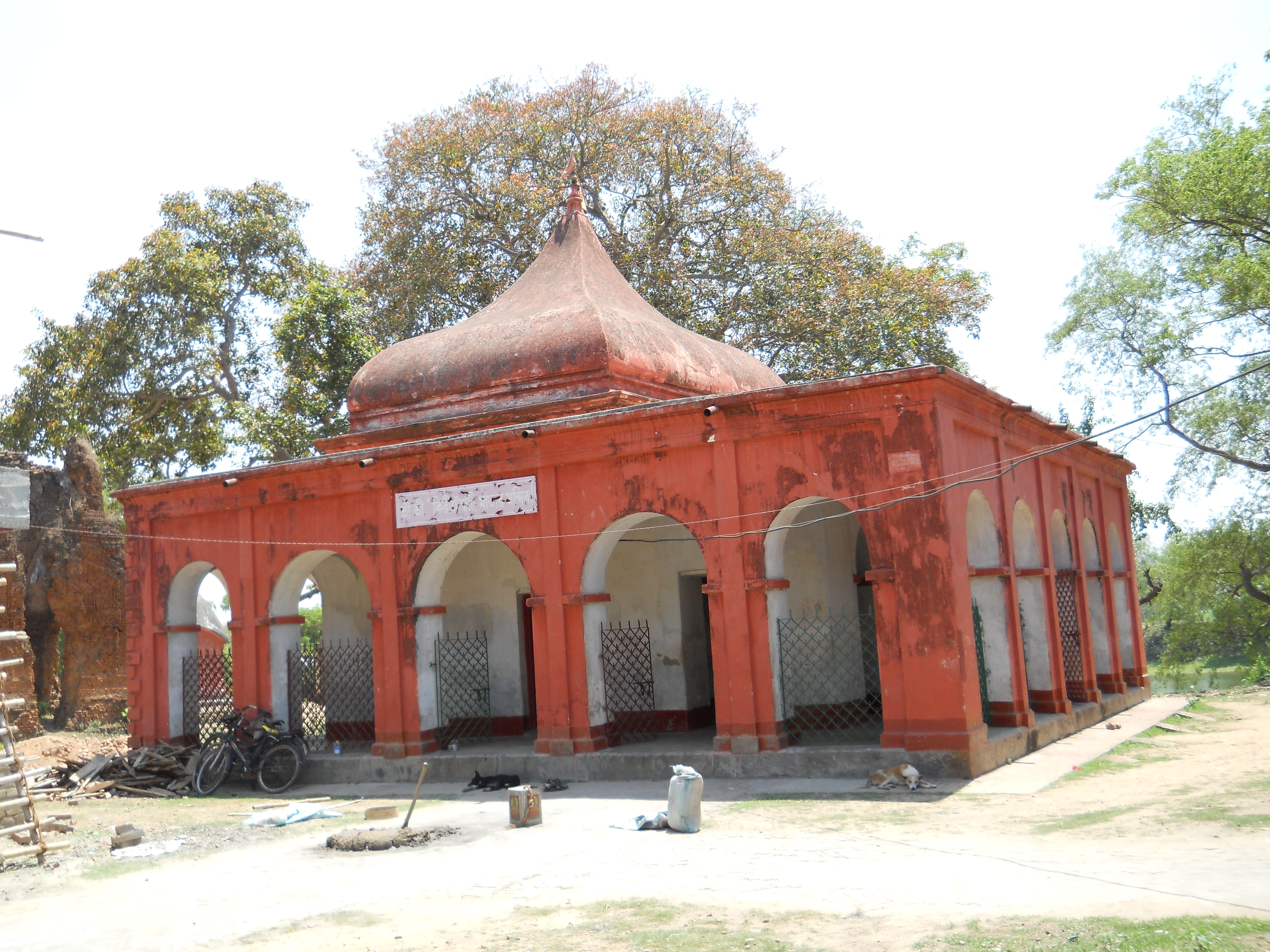
Kiriteswari Temple at Kiritkona in Murshidabad district is a char-chala having curved cornice and with an ek-bangla porch

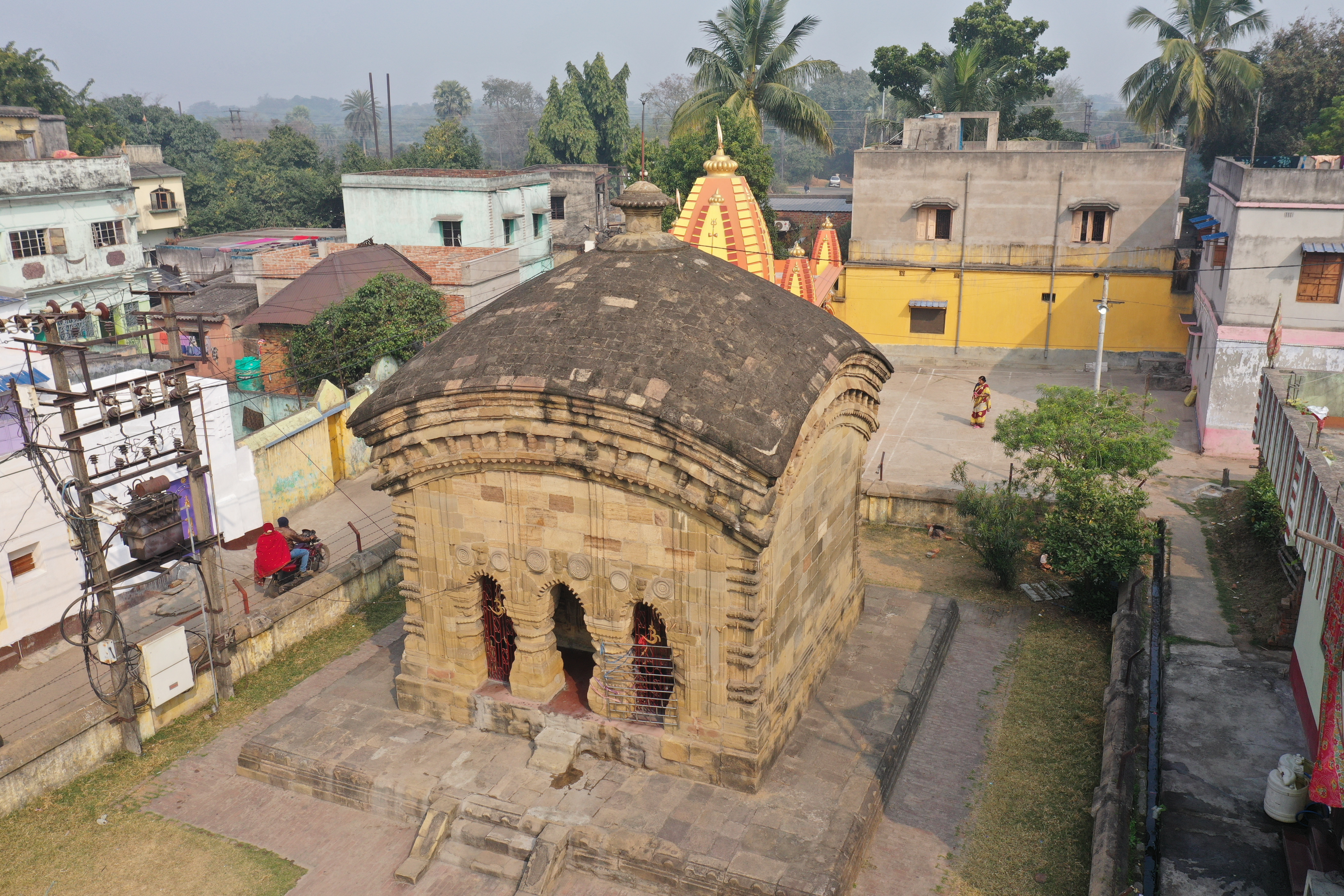
14th century temple, Garui, Paschim Bardhaman, West Bengal

== Ratna temple ==
The curved roof of a ratna temple "is surmounted by one or more towers or pinnacles called ratna (jewel). The simplest form has a single central tower (eka-ratna), to which may be added four more at the corners (pancha-ratna)". The number of towers or pinnacles can be increased up to a maximum of twenty-five. The ratna style was developed in 16th-17th century in Bengal .

"Ratna style temples are the composite type of architecture... The lower part of the temple has all the features of the curved cornices and a short pointed spire crowns the roof and this will be adorned with the introduction of ratnas or kiosks."

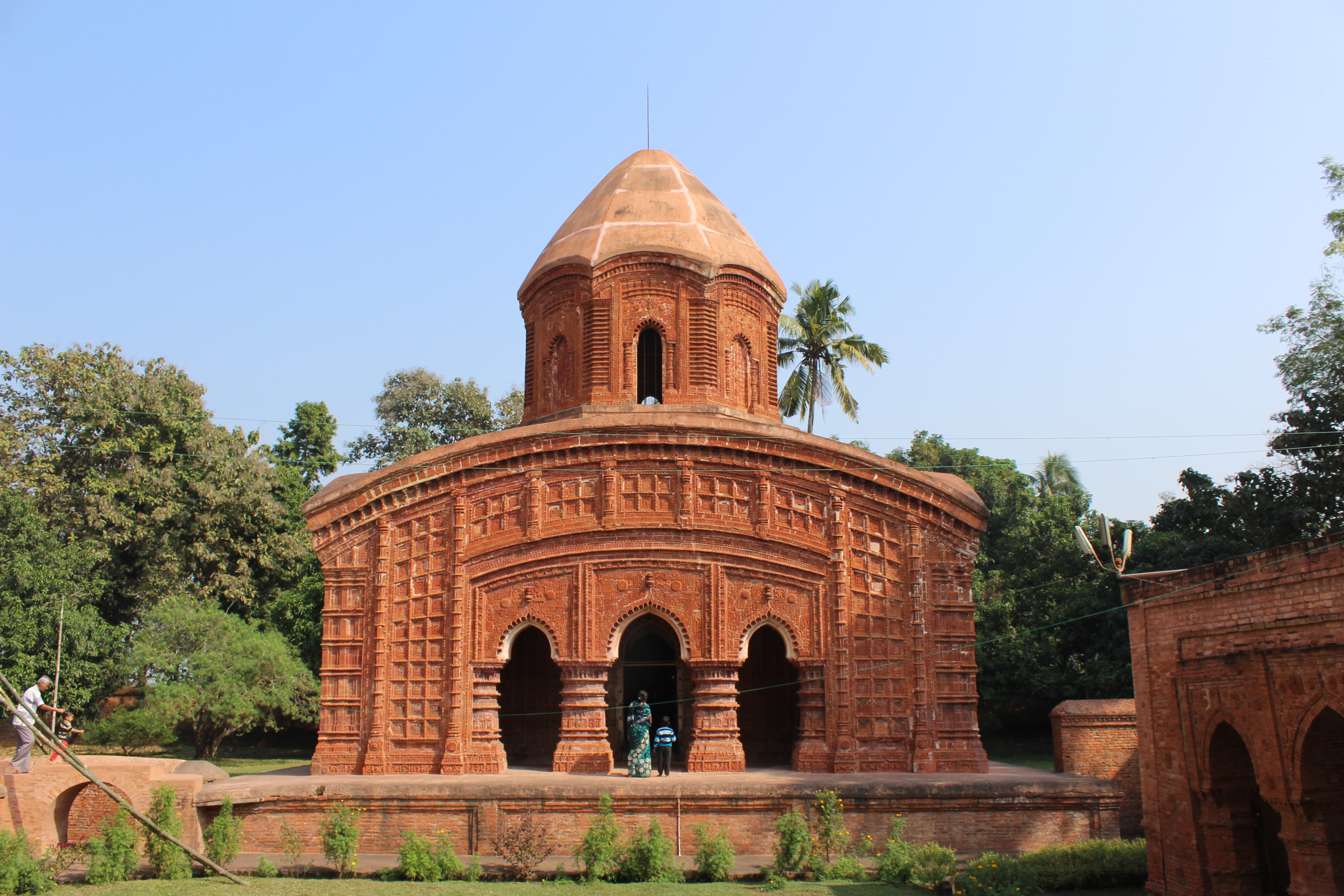
Ek-ratna Ramchandraji temple at Guptipara, Hooghly district

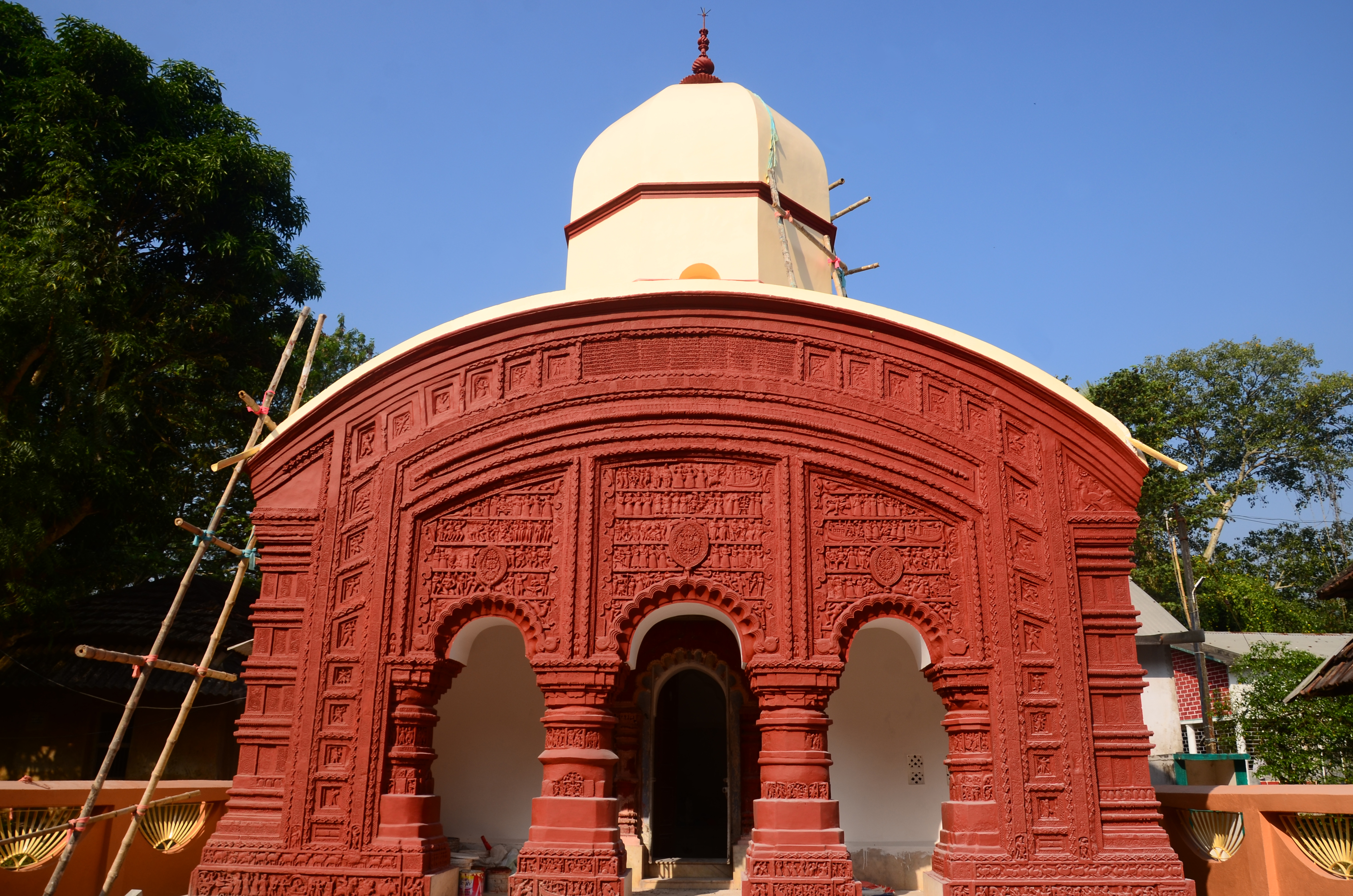
Ek-ratna temple at Radhakantapur, Paschim Medinipur district

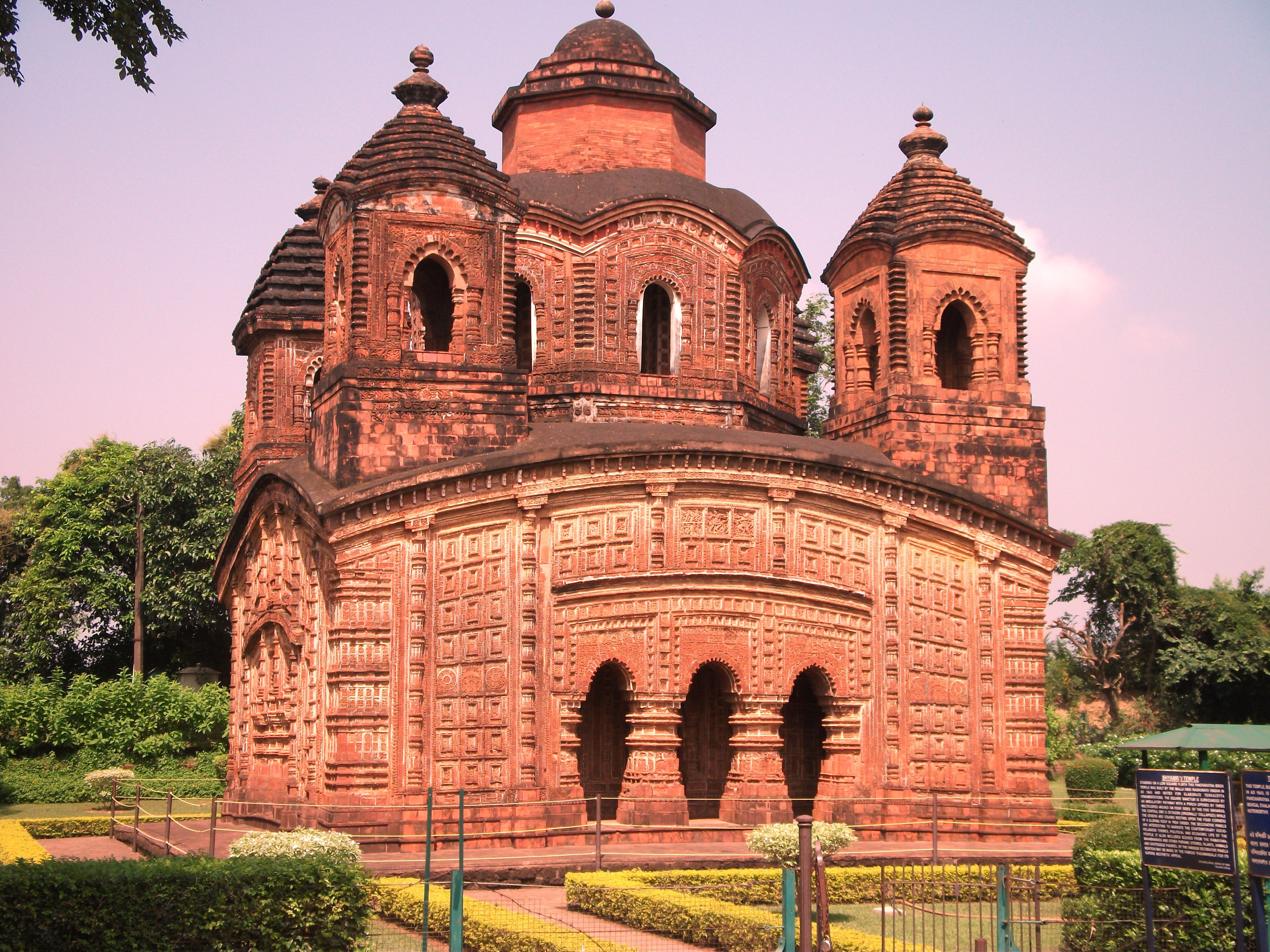
Pancha-ratna Shyam Rai temple at Bishnupur, Bankura district

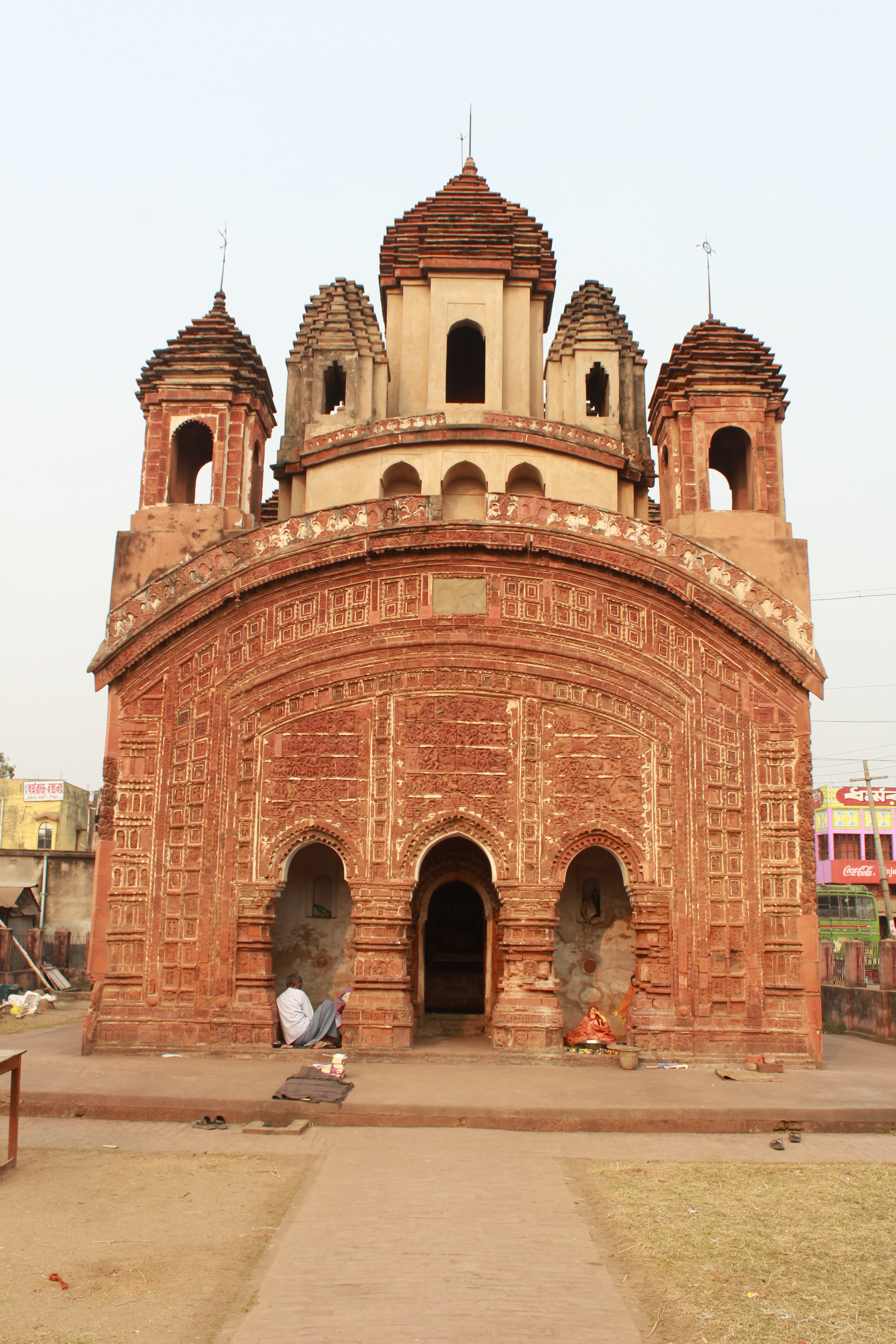
Nava-ratna Radha Binode temple at Jaydev Kenduli, Birbhum district

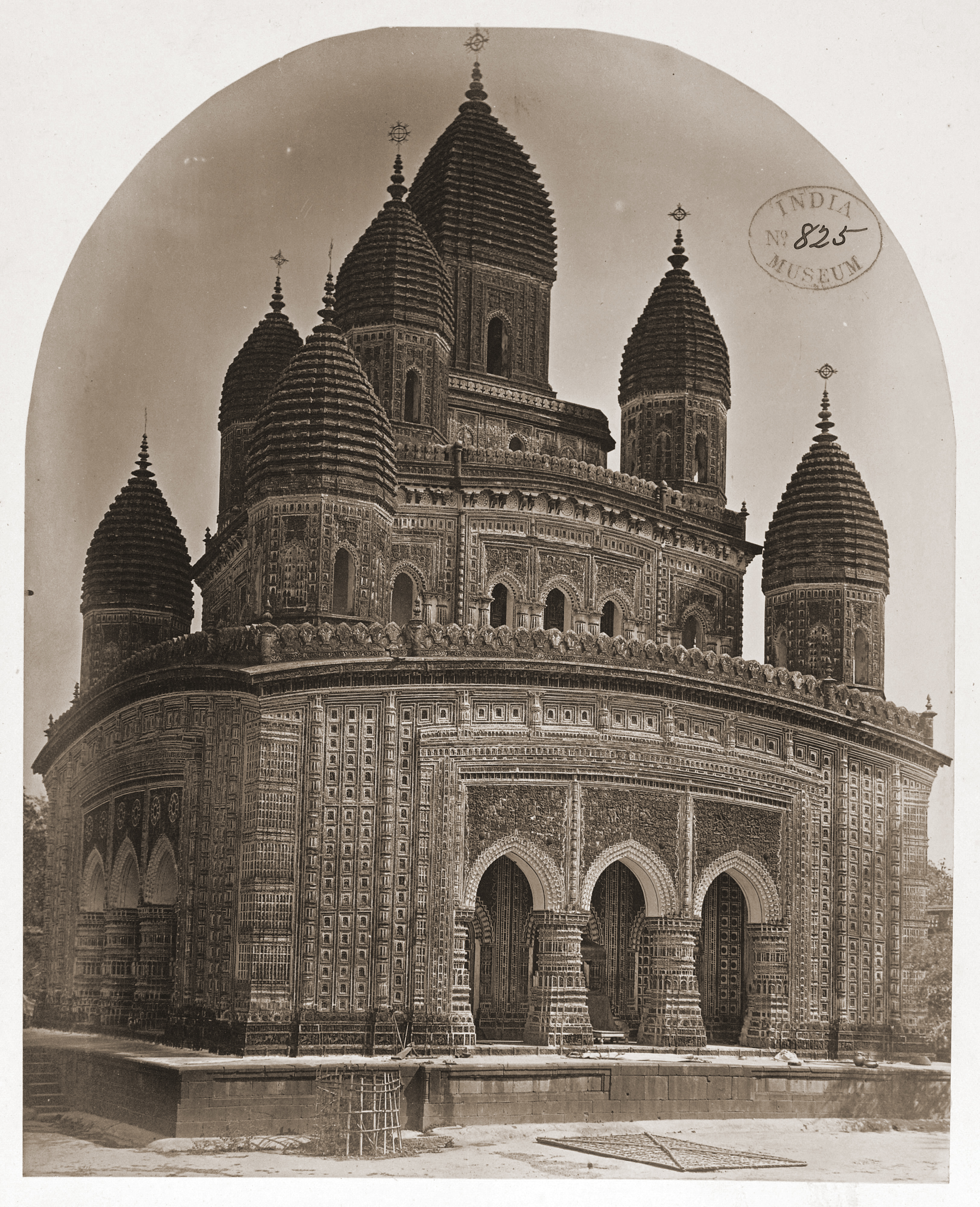
Naba-ratna Kantajew Temple in Dinajpur, Bangladesh.

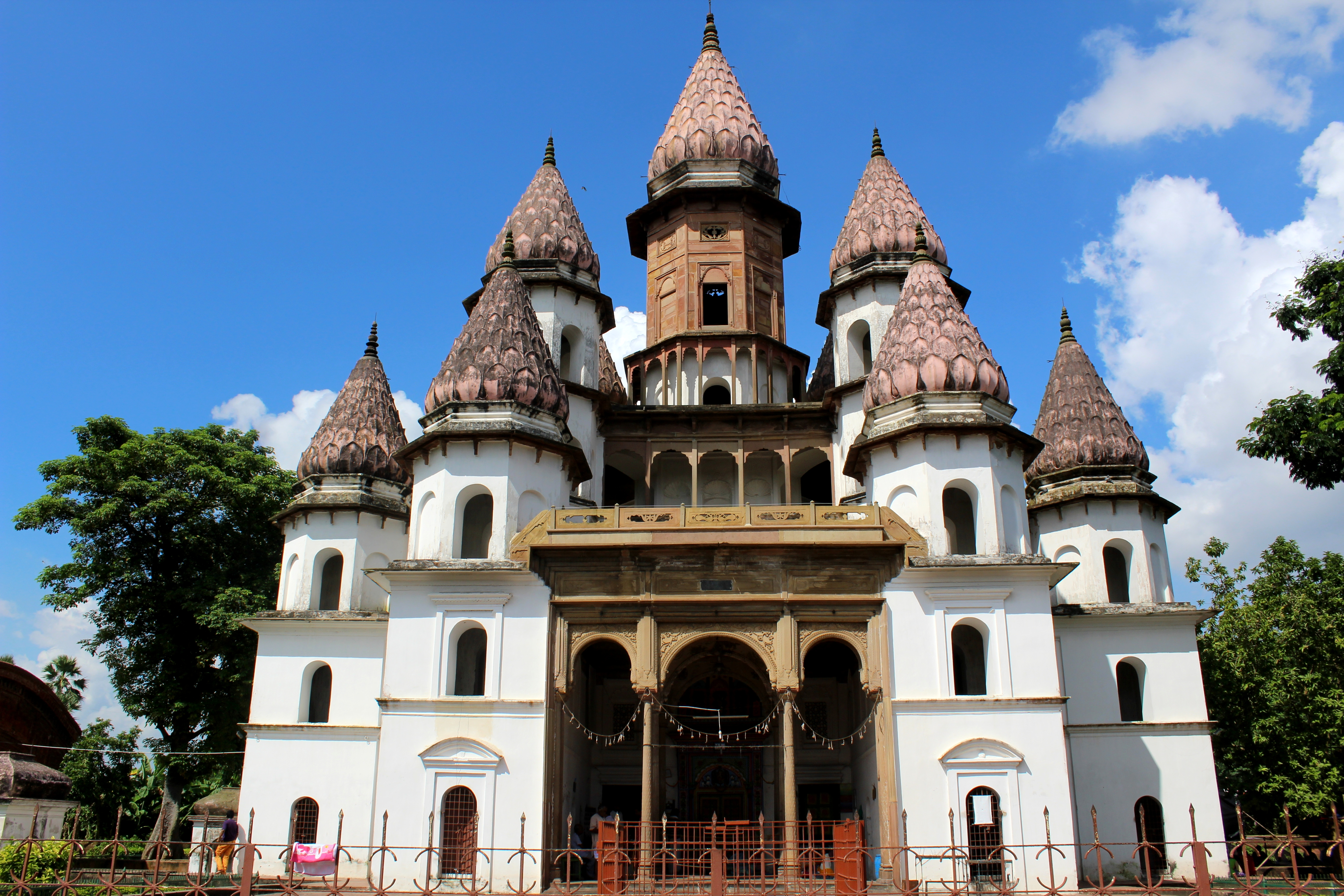
With 13 minars Hangseshwari temple has a distinct identity, at Bansberia, Hooghly district

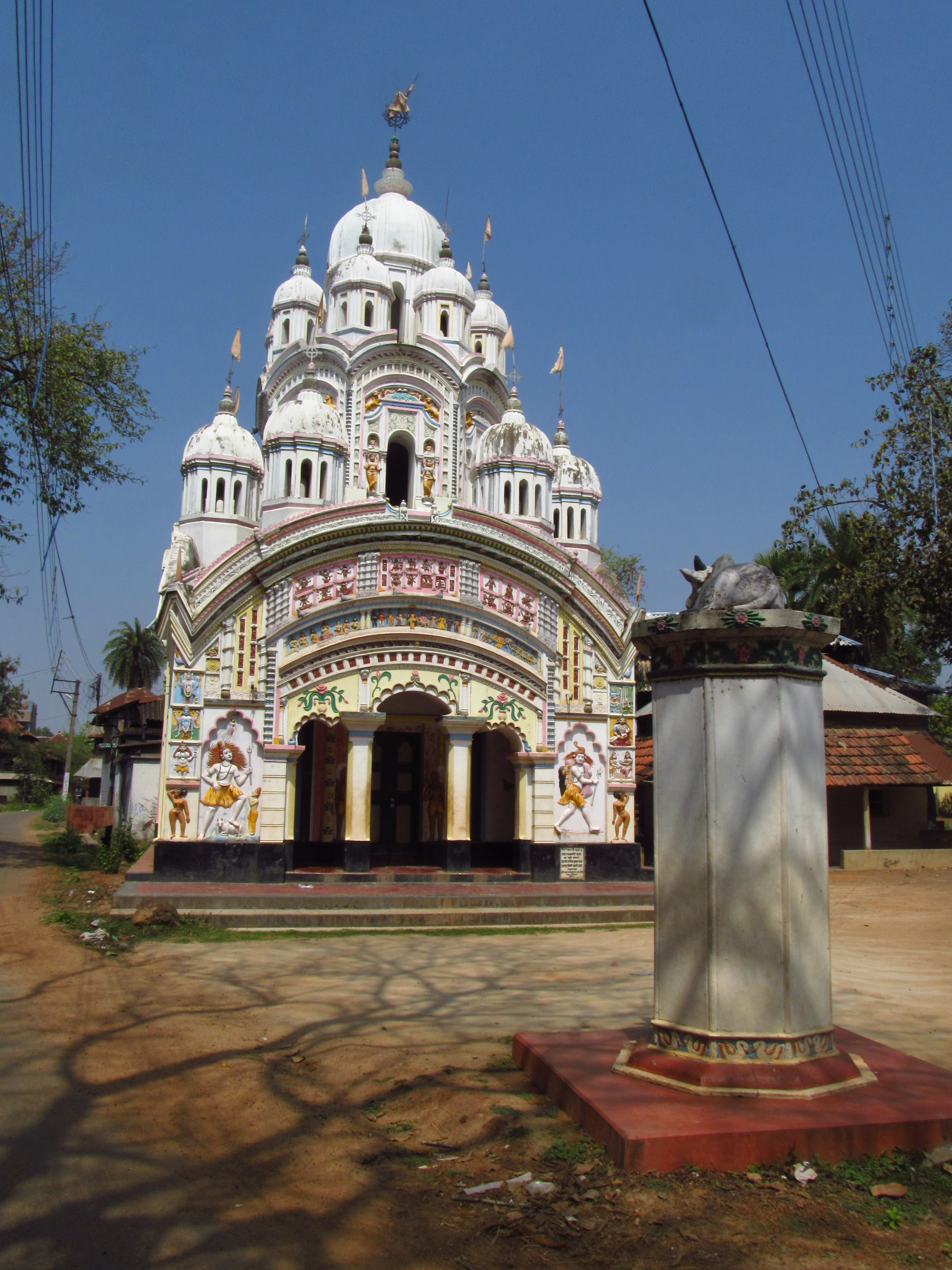
Saptadasa-ratna Parvatinatha Temple at Chandrakona, Paschim Medinipur district with 17 pinnacles

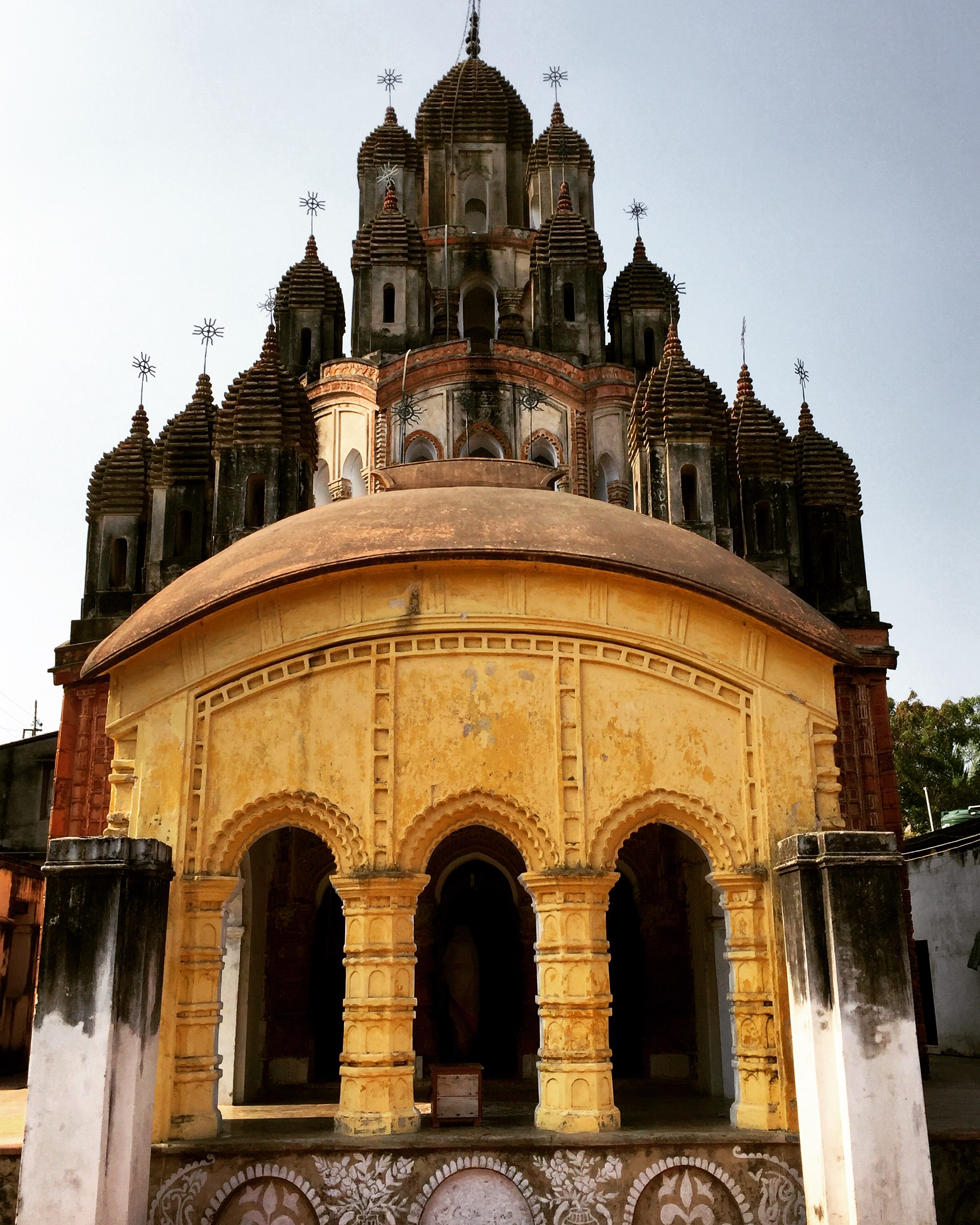
Panchavimsati-ratna Gopalbari temple at Kalna City, Purba Bardhaman district, with 25 pinnacles

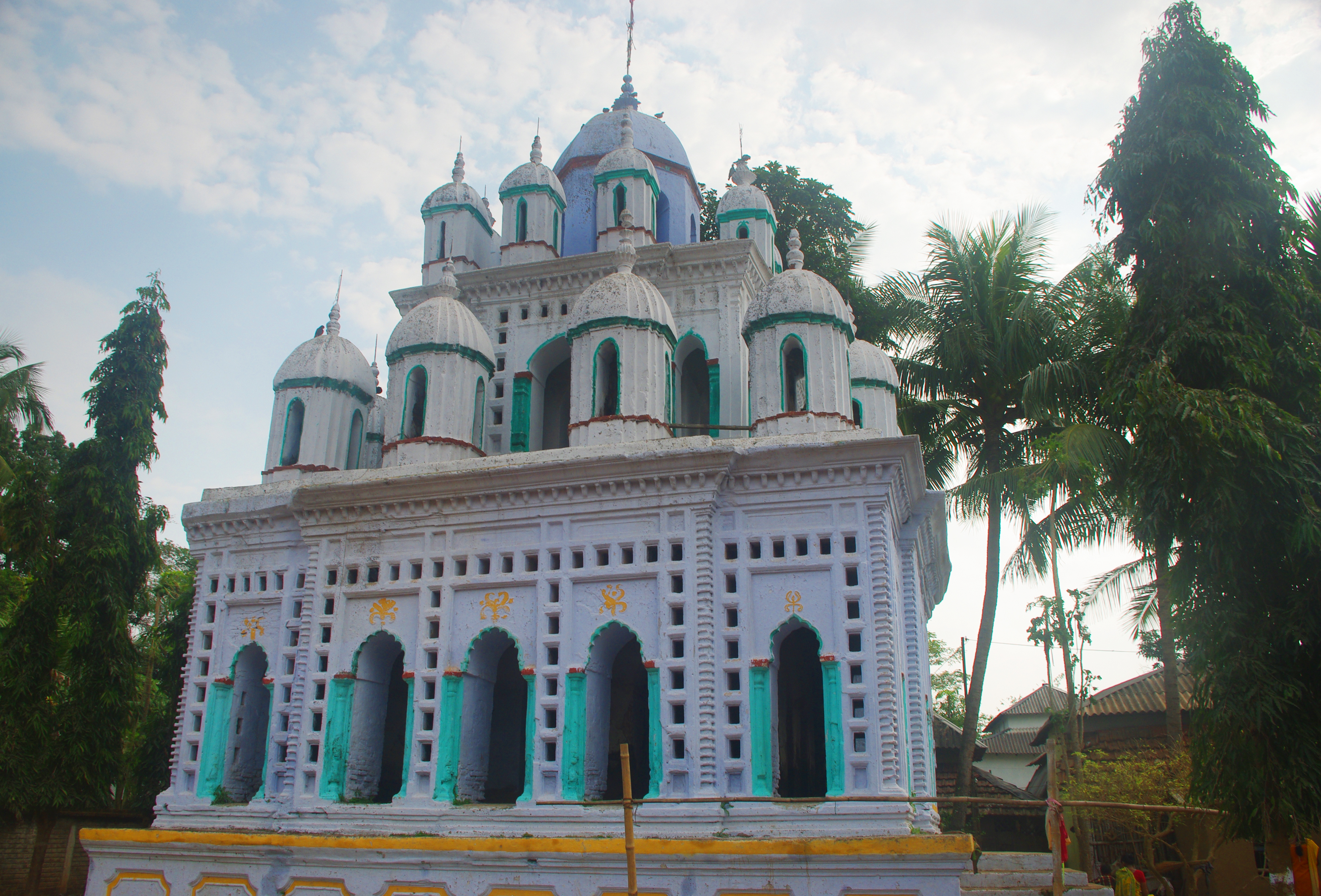
Panchavimsati-ratna rasmancha at Narajole, Paschim Medinipur district, with 25 pinnacles

== Dalan temple ==
The flat-roofed temples or dalan temples came up in the 19th century. It combined the use of barrel vaults introduced during medieval period with native usage of horse-shoe shaped curved arches. In the long run, this style lost its special identity as religious architecture and got mixed up with domestic architecture.

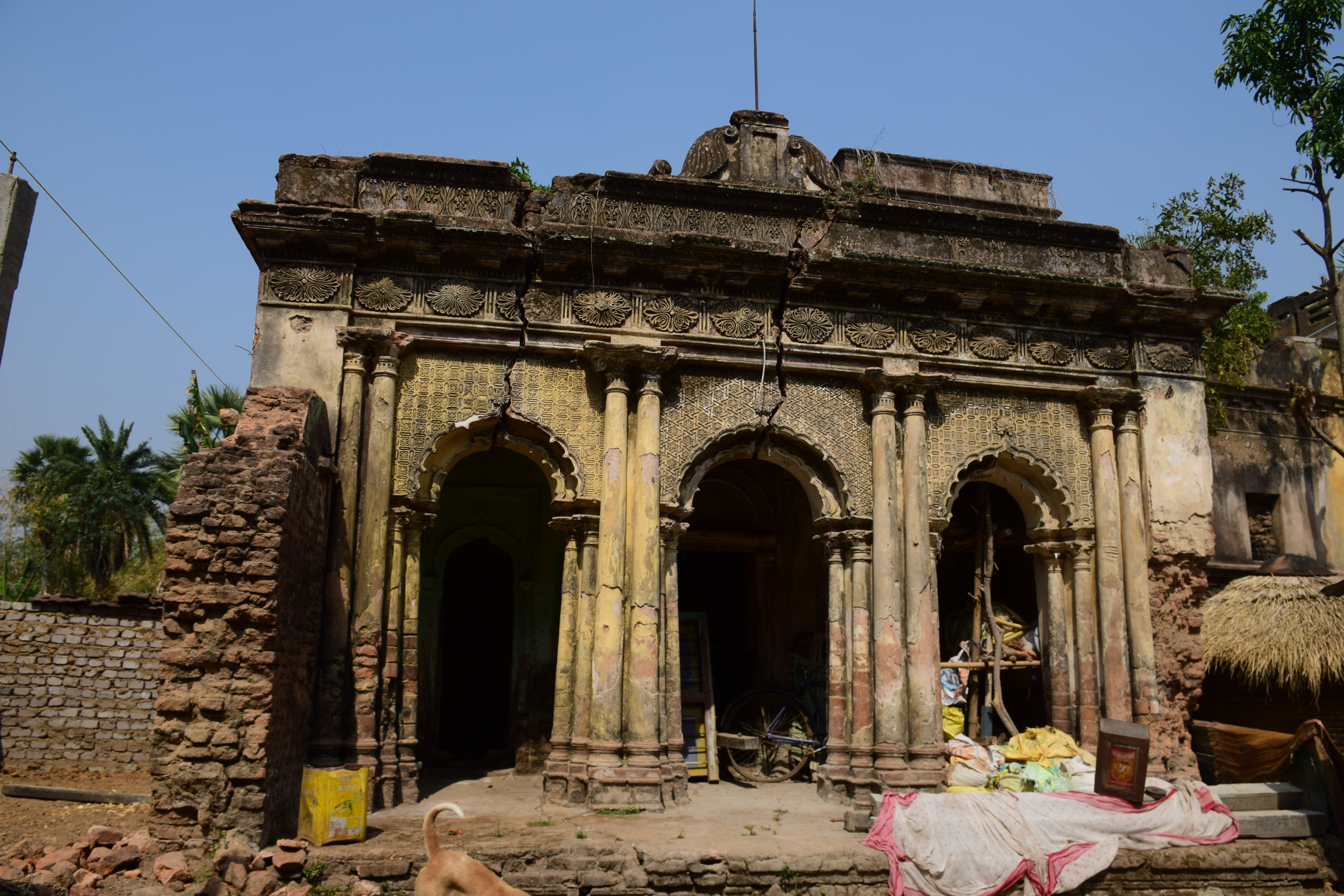
Flat-roofed dalan temple at Bhalki, Purba Bardhaman

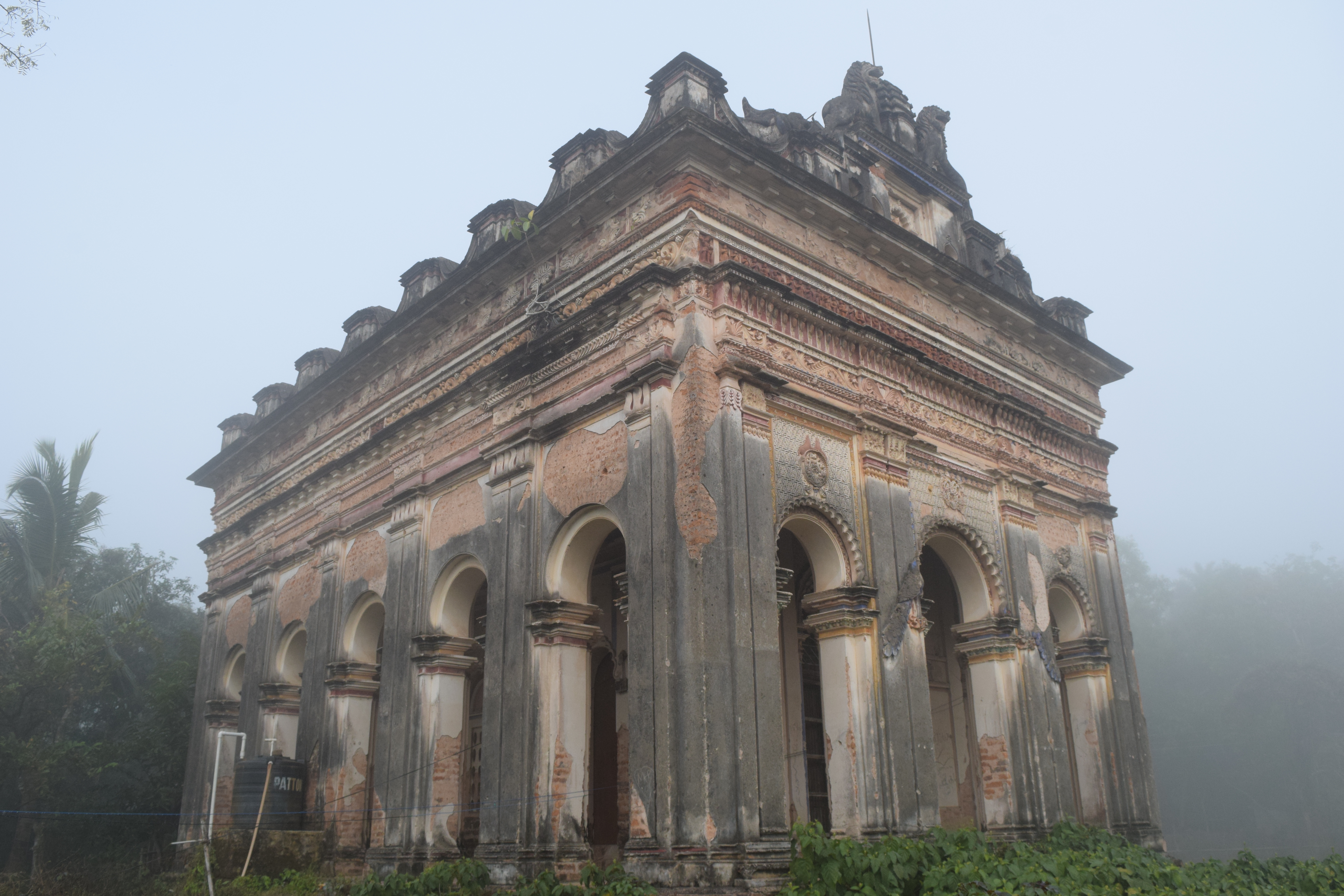
Dalan temple, Sharabhuja Gauranga temple at Panchrol, Purba Medinipur district

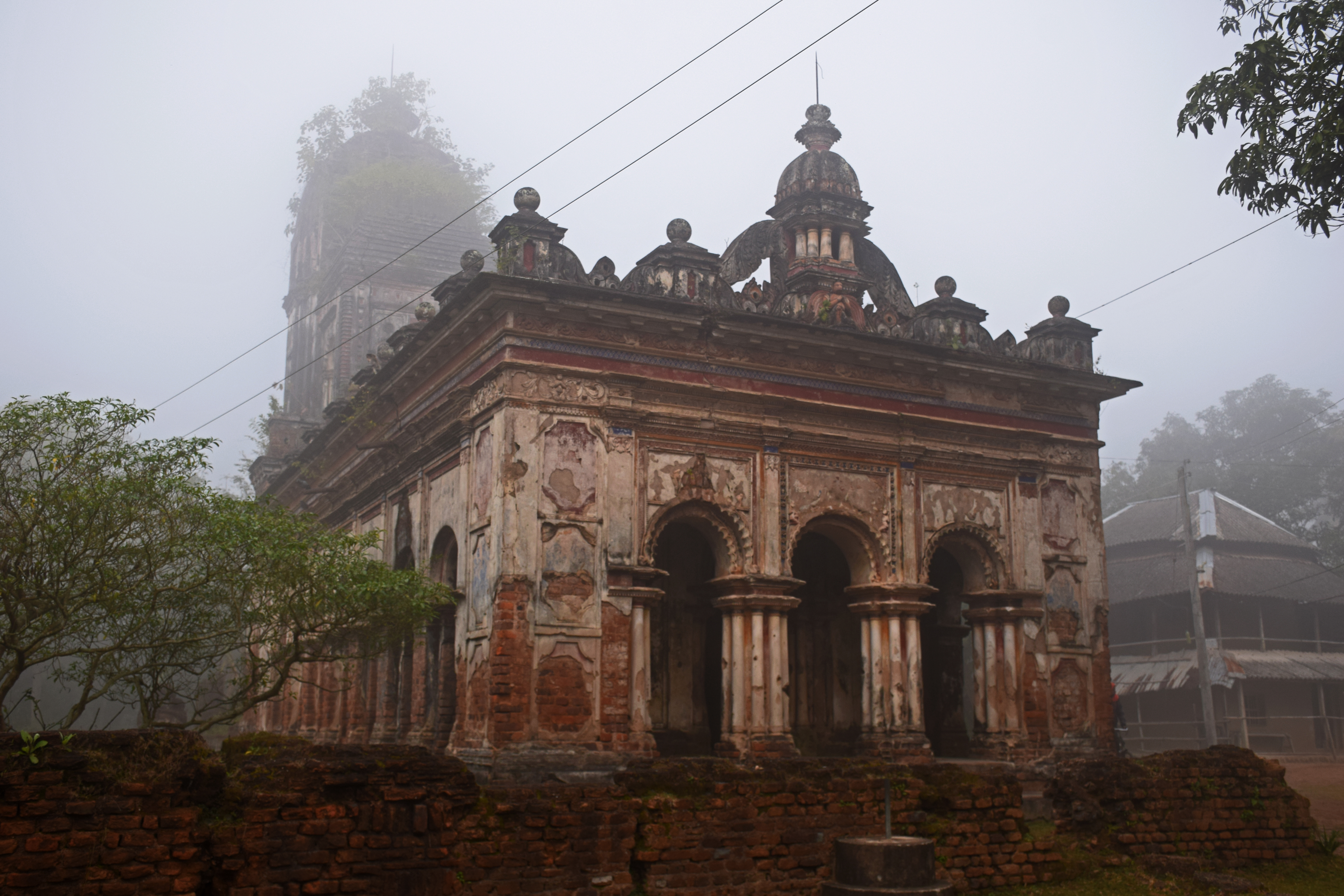
Dalan temple with rekha deul superstructure, Radha Binoda temple at Panchrol, Purba Medinipur district

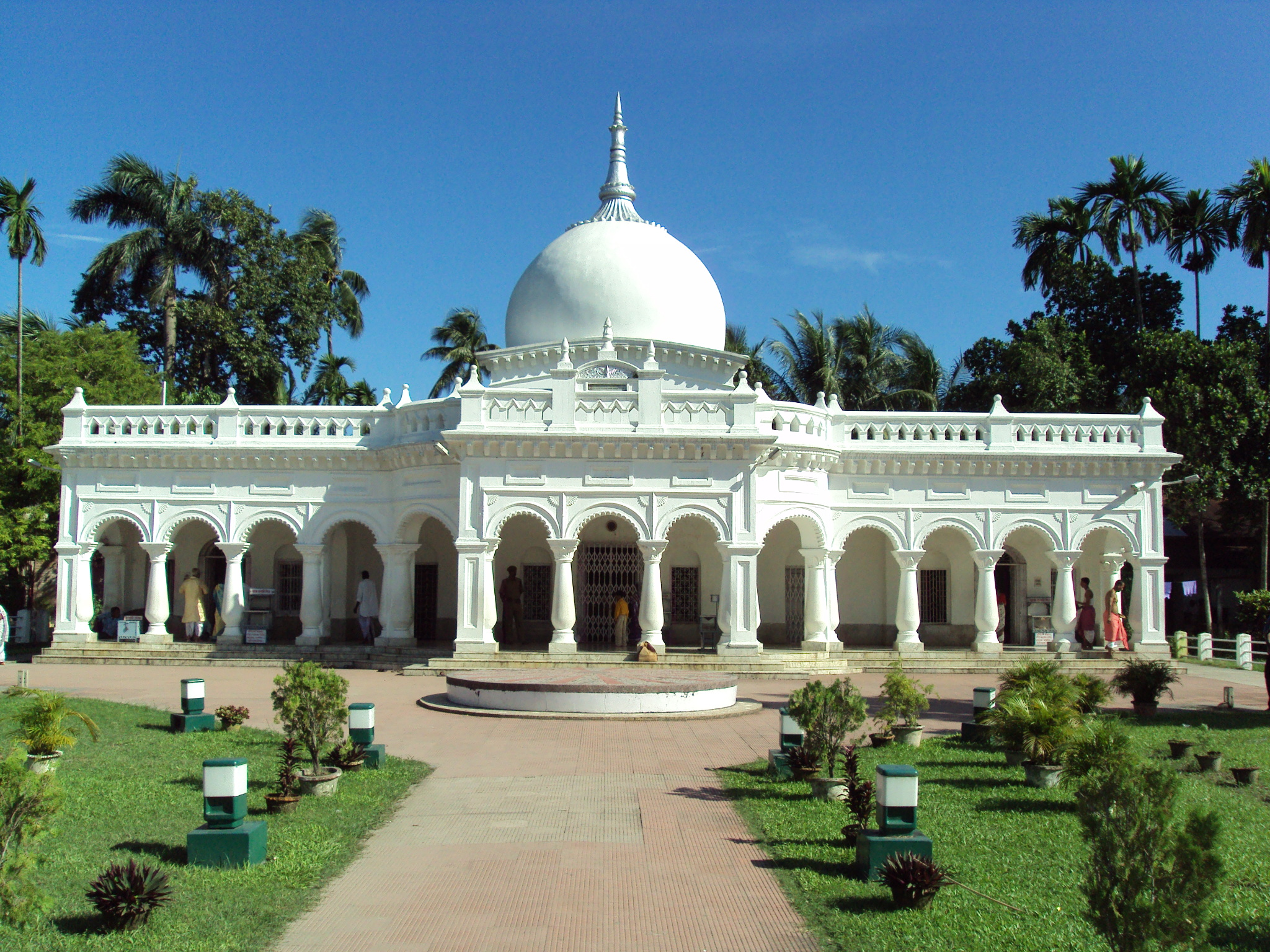
Flat roofed dalan with dome, Madan Mohan Bari, Cooch Behar

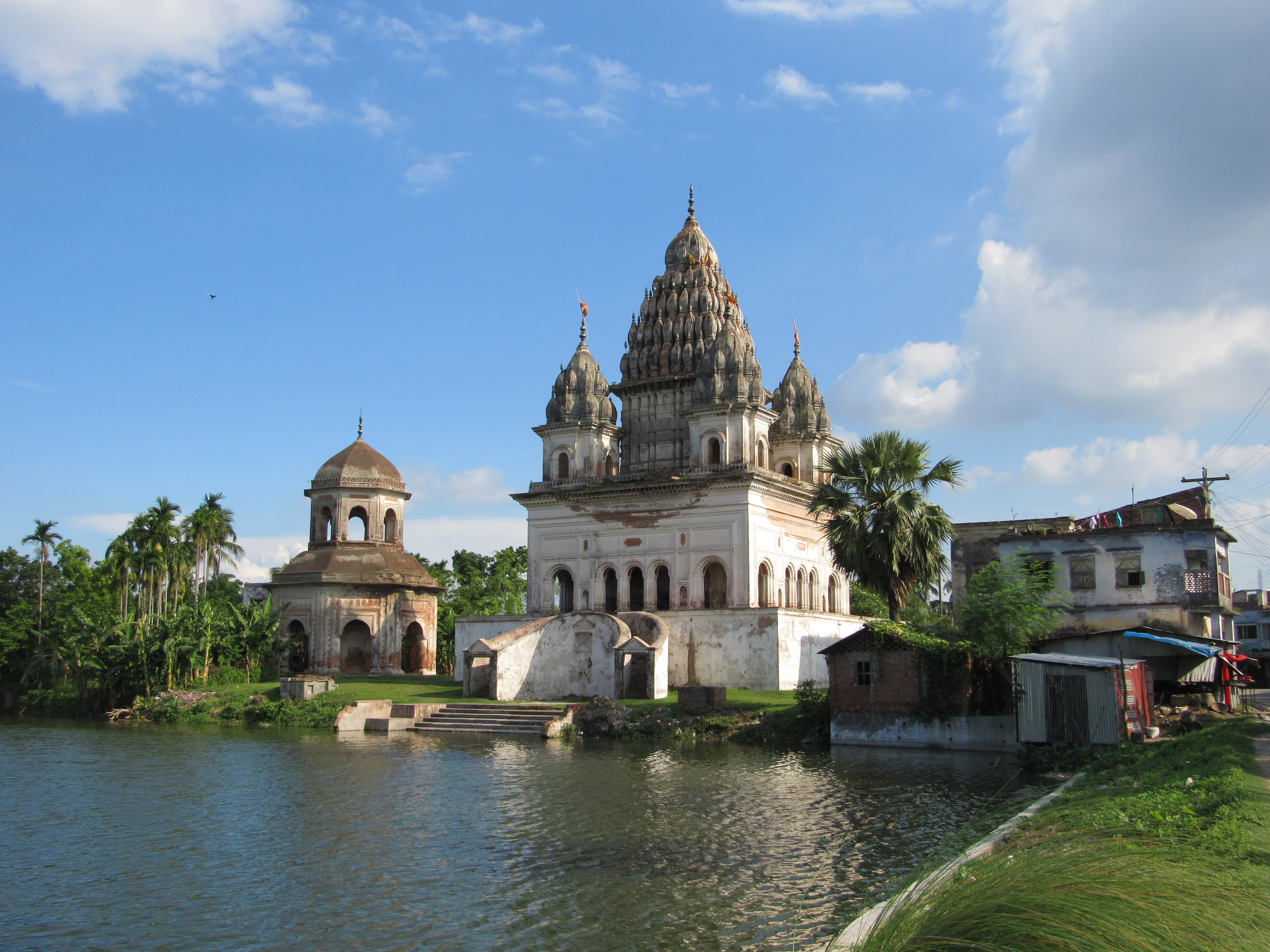
Flat roofed dalan with pancha-ratna superstructure in the Puthia Temple Complex at Puthia Upazila, Rajshahi district, Bangladesh

== East Bengali shikhari style ==
In eastern Bengal (present day Bangladesh), the rekha deul style evolved during the late Mughal era into a distinct style called shikhari (colloquially called math), characterised by an octagonal bases bearing the curvilinear chalas supporting a tapering pyramidal sikhara. In some cases the octagonal base of the pyramidal sikhara might be placed upon a traditional four-cornerned base. This change is believed to have occurred under the influence of Mughal architecture.

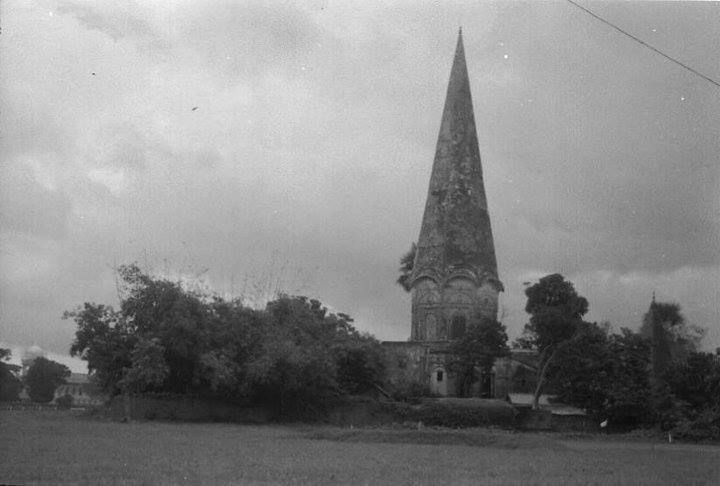
Ramna Kali Mandir in Dhaka, Bangladesh. The original structure (in picture) was vandalised as a part of the Bangladesh genocide.

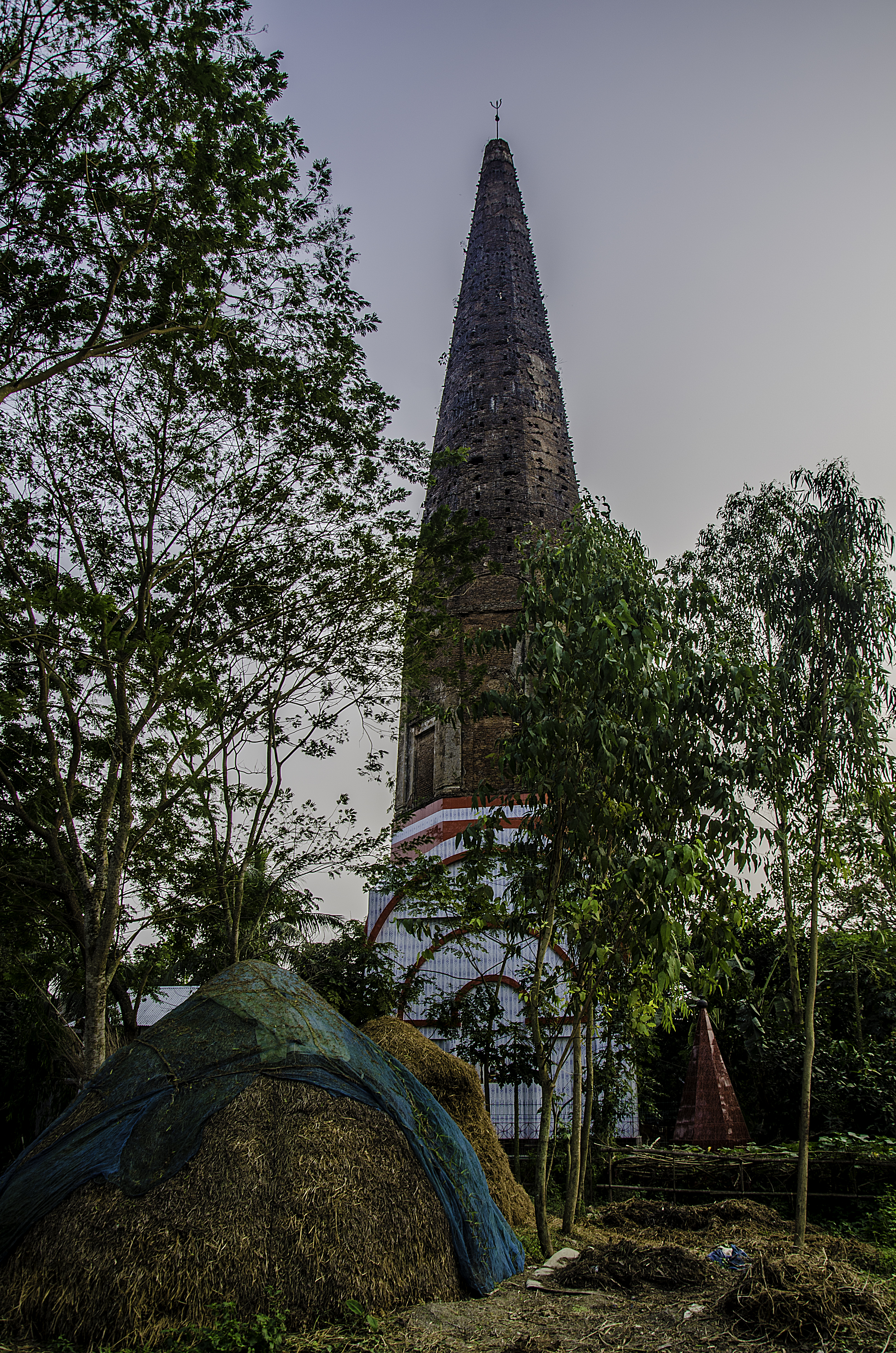
Shyamsiddhi Math, Mushiganj, Dhaka, Bangladesh. 19th century

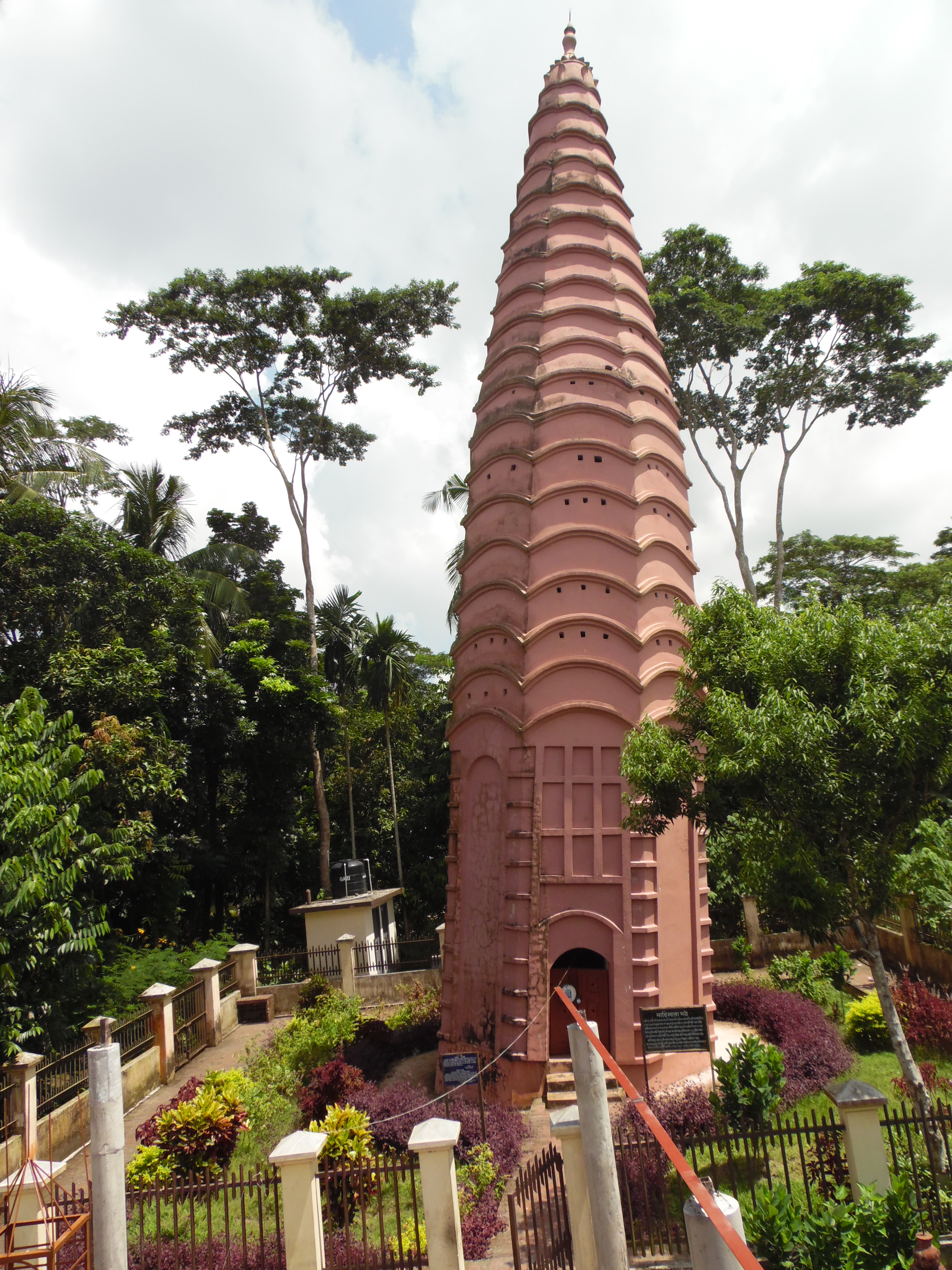
Mahilara Sarkar Math, Barishal, Barishal, Bangladesh, 18th century

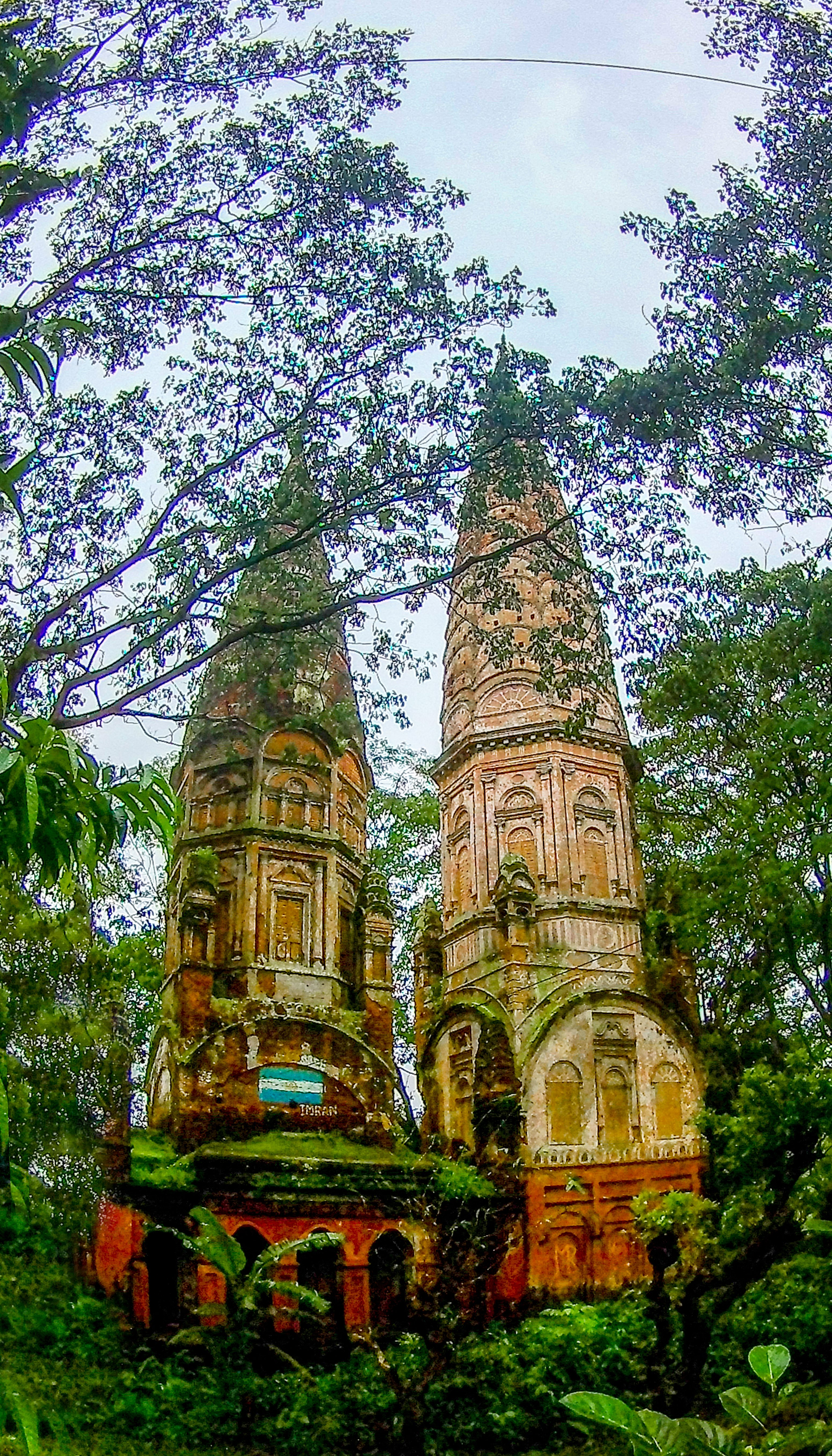
Sonarang Twin Temples, Munshiganj, Dhaka, Bangladesh

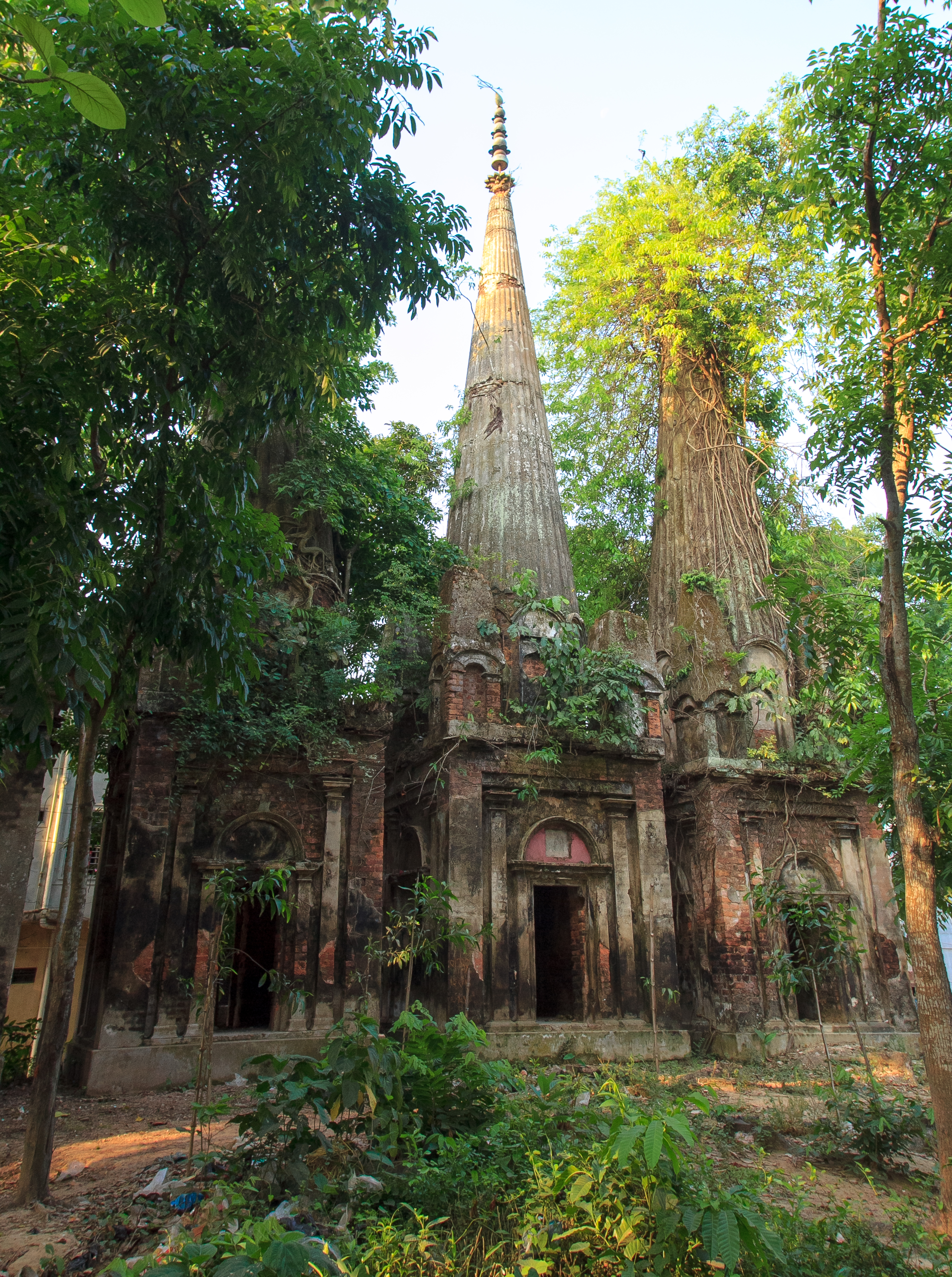
Sat Math, Feni, Chittagong, Bangladesh, 19th century

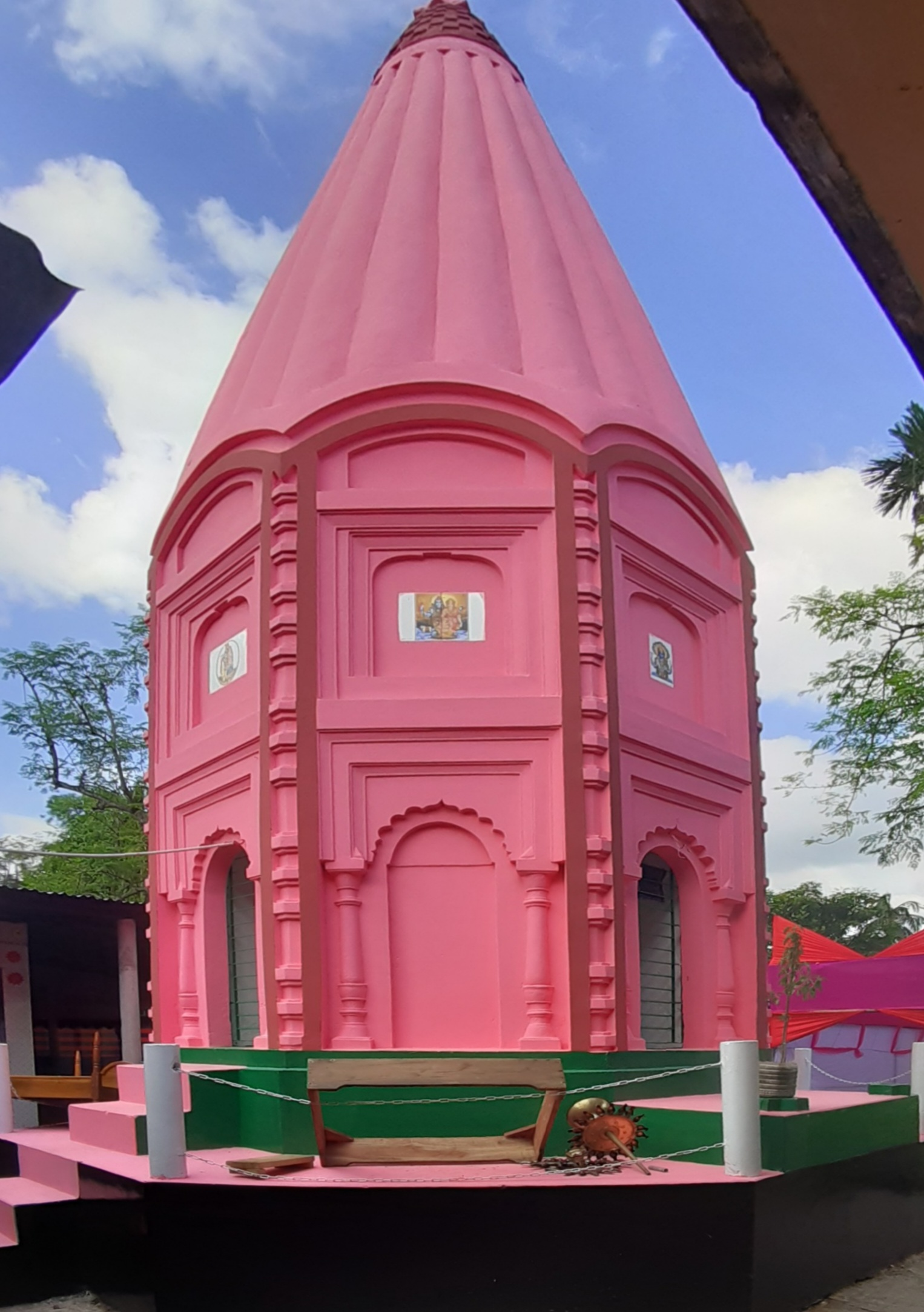
Pagalshankarjiu temple, Brahmanbaria, Chittagong, Bangladesh, 19th century

== Grouped temple ==
Temples of identical style and size are sometimes grouped together. Two identical Shiva temples are called a Jora Shiva temple. Groups of four, six and twelve Shiva temples are quite popular. The most elaborate groups existing have 108 Shiva temples.

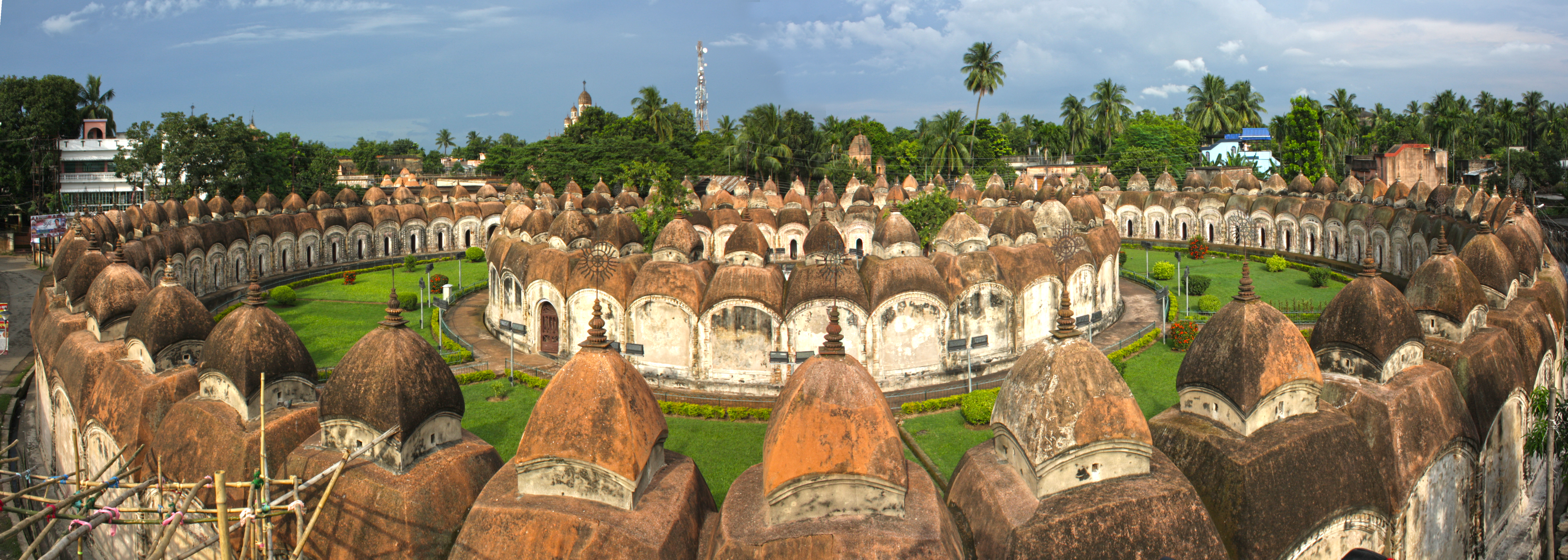
Nava Kailash housing 108 Shiva temples at Kalna City, Purba Bardhaman district

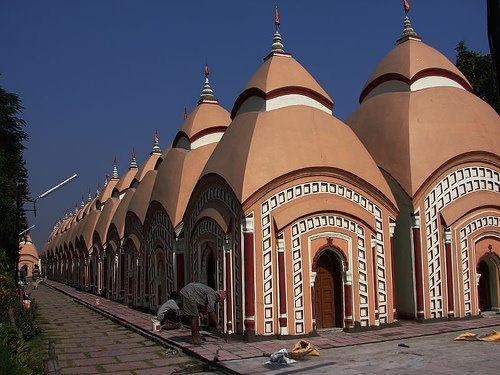
108 Shiva temples at Nababhat, Bardhaman, Purba Bardhaman district

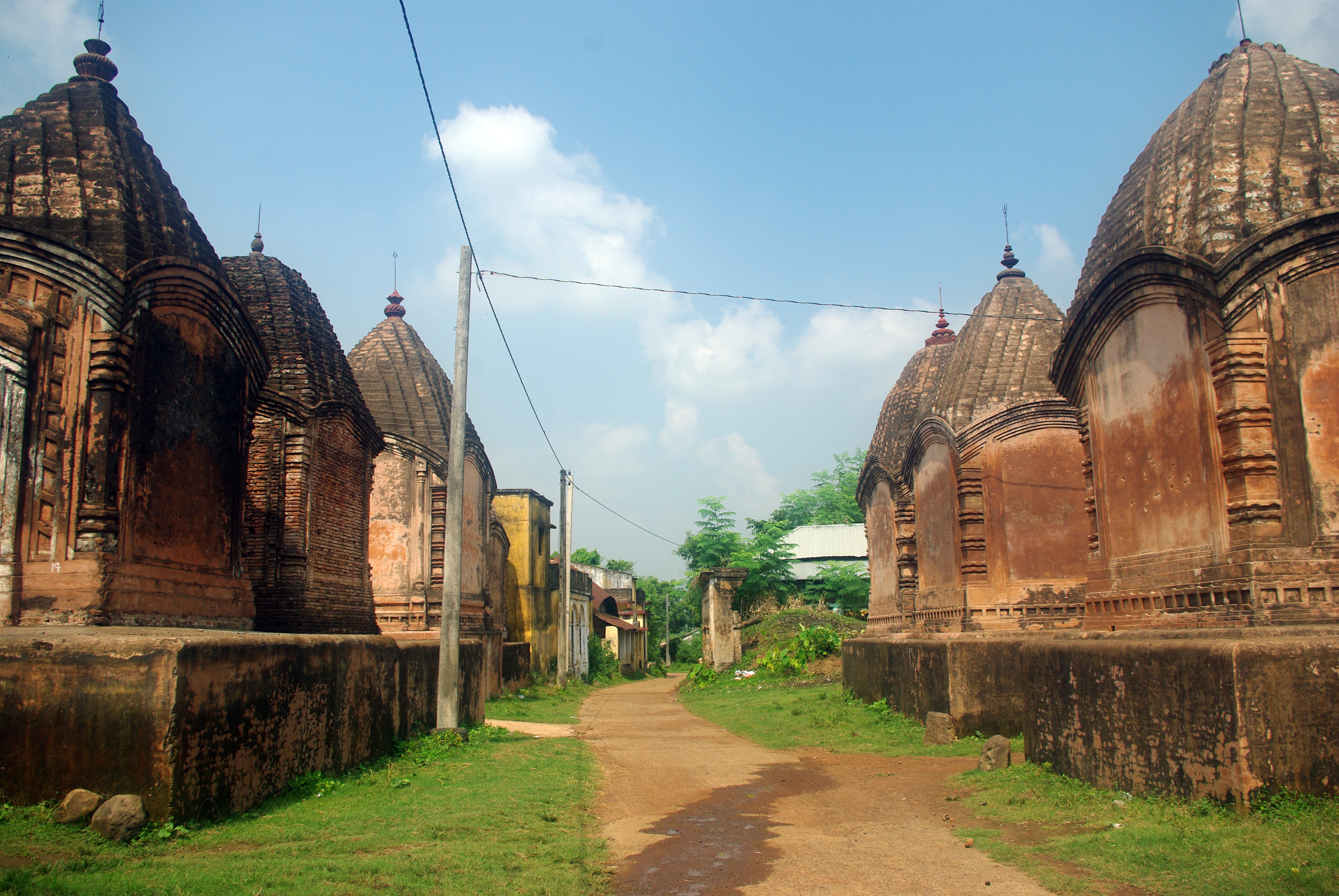
Maluti temples at Maluti, Dumka district, Jharkhand near the West Bengal border. 36 of the original 108 temples have been destroyed; 72 remain today.

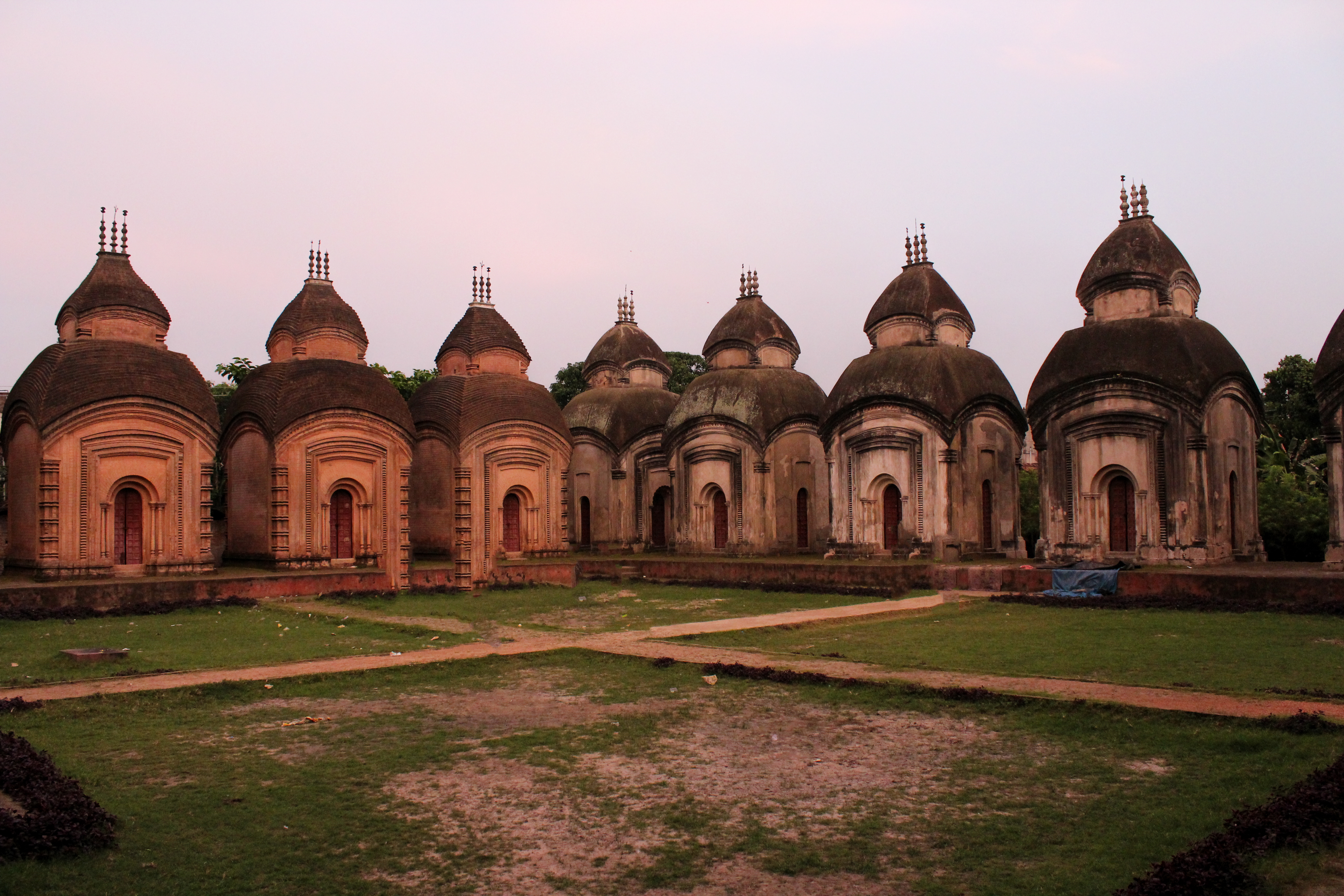
26 Shiva temples at Khardaha, North 24 Parganas district

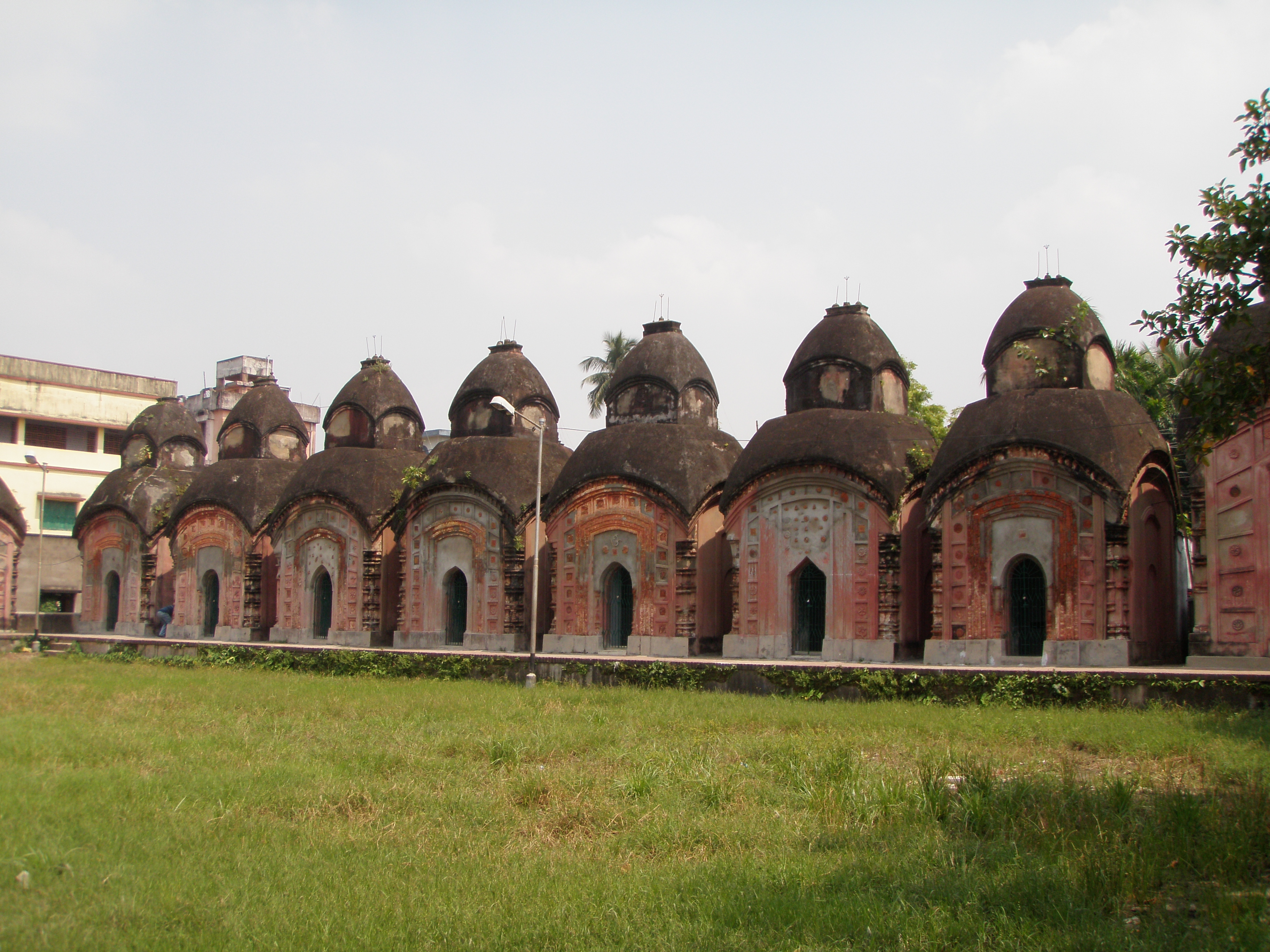
Dwadash Shiva Temples at Barisha locality in Kolkata

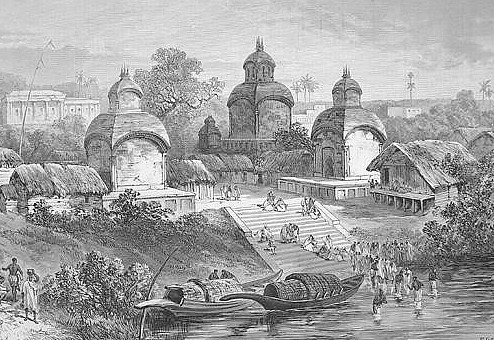
Cluster of 3 At-chala temples at Kalighat Temple complex, Kolkata, West Bengal

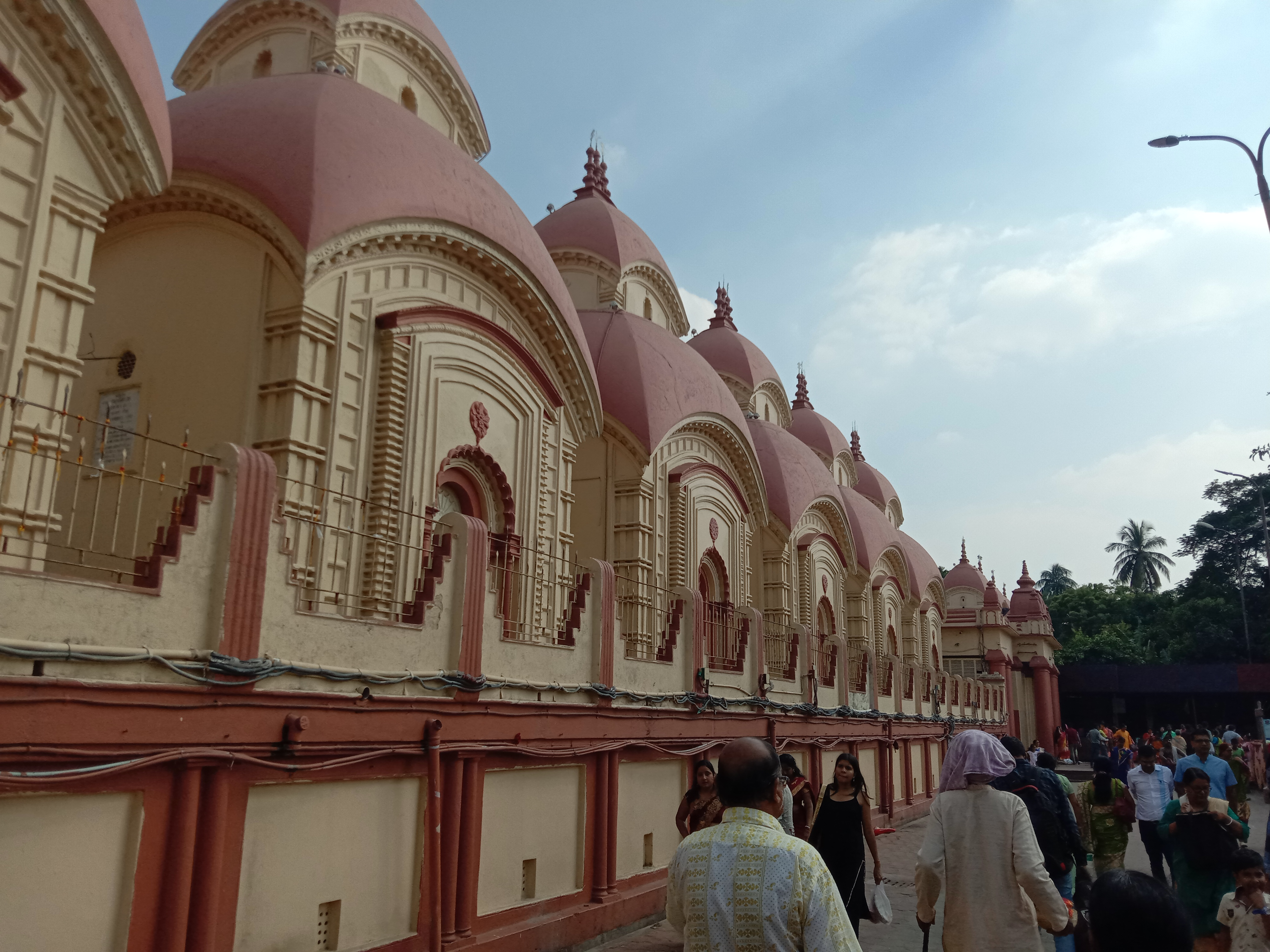
Cluster of 12 At-chala Shiva temples at Dakshineswar Temple complex, North 24 Parganas

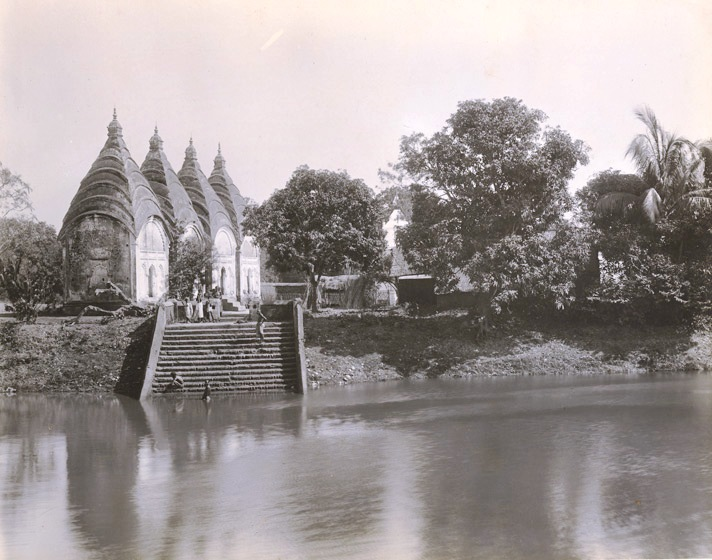
Cluster of 4 Char-chala Shiva temples at Dhakeshwari Temple complex, Dhaka, Bangladesh

== See also ==
- Architecture of Bengal
- Bengal roofs
- Architecture of Bangladesh
- Art Deco in Kolkata
