= Malliswari =

Malliswari or Malleswari may refer to:

- Malliswari (1951 film), 1951 Indian Telugu-language film directed by B. N. Reddi
- Malliswari (2004 film), 2004 Indian Telugu-language film directed by K. Vijaya Bhaskar
- Malleswari, an Indian Telugu-language TV show
- Karnam Malleswari (born 1975), Indian weight lifter

== See also ==
- Malleswaran, the highest peak in the Attappadi Forest Reserve in Attappadi taluk, Palakkad district, Kerala, India
- Malleshwaram, Bengaluru, a neighborhood of Bangalore (Bengaluru), India
  - Malleshwaram Assembly constituency, in the Karnataka Legislative Assembly
- Malleswara Shiva Temple, a Hindu temple in West Bengal, India
