= List of State Protected Monuments in West Bengal =

This is a list of State Protected Monuments as officially reported by and available through the website of the Archaeological Survey of India in the Indian state West Bengal. The monument identifier is a combination of the abbreviation of the subdivision of the list (state, ASI circle) and the numbering as published on the website of the ASI. 106 State Protected Monuments have been recognized by the ASI in West Bengal. Besides the State Protected Monuments, also the Monuments of National Importance in this state might be relevant.

The West Bengal Heritage Commission has further declared an additional list of 244 Declared Heritage Sites.

== List of State Protected Monuments ==
SL. No.	Description	Location	Address	District	Coordinates	Image
S-WB-1	Temple of Nandkishore	Halisahar		North 24 Parganas	22°56′13″N 88°24′52″E	Temple of Nandkishore More images
S-WB-2	Surya temple	Sonatapal		Bankura	23°12′57″N 87°07′35″E	Surya temple More images
S-WB-3	Basuli temple (Abandoned)	Atbhaichandi		Bankura	23°07′46″N 86°58′59″E	Basuli temple (Abandoned) More images
S-WB-4	Abandoned temple of Shyamchand	Dharapat		Bankura	23°07′58″N 87°17′43″E	Abandoned temple of Shyamchand More images
S-WB-5	Jain temple	Deulbhirra		Bankura	22°57′09″N 87°09′41″E	Jain temple More images
S-WB-6	Temple of Jhagrai Chandi	Uttarbar, Baital		Bankura	22°57′49″N 87°29′36″E	Upload Photo
S-WB-7	Temple of Lakshmi Janrdan	Uttarbadh Baital		Bankura		Upload Photo
S-WB-8	Temple of Shyamchand	Dakshinbadh Baital		Bankura	22°56′34″N 87°29′18″E	Temple of Shyamchand More images
S-WB-9	Abandoned temple of Radhakrishna	Bikrampur		Bankura	23°09′58″N 87°08′55″E	Abandoned temple of Radhakrishna More images
S-WB-10	Temple of Radha Krishna	Muninagar		Bankura	23°07′25″N 87°22′32″E	Temple of Radha Krishna More images
S-WB-11	Abandoned temple of Shyamchand	Elyati (Belatukri)		Bankura	23°12′25″N 87°10′34″E	Abandoned temple of Shyamchand More images
S-WB-12	Abandoned temple Gour Nitai	Tejpal		Bankura	23°04′45″N 87°18′00″E	Abandoned temple Gour Nitai More images
S-WB-13	Abandoned temple of Yadav Rai	Jadabnagar		Bankura		Upload Photo
S-WB-14	Temple of Hakanda	Moynapur		Bankura	23°00′25″N 87°28′57″E	Temple of Hakanda More images
S-WB-15	Temple of Damodar	Kotulpur (Bazarpara)		Bankura	23°01′11″N 87°35′51″E	Temple of Damodar More images
S-WB-16	Octagonal Siva temple	Supur		Birbhum	23°37′44″N 87°41′11″E	Octagonal Siva temple More images
S-WB-17	Temple of Kali	Itanda		Birbhum	23°36′01″N 87°46′02″E	Temple of Kali More images
S-WB-18	Navaratna temple	Brahmandidhi		Birbhum		Upload Photo
S-WB-19	Temple of Gouranga	Ilambazar		Birbhum	23°37′37″N 87°32′19″E	Temple of Gouranga More images
S-WB-20	Motichur mosque	Rajanagar		Birbhum	23°56′53″N 87°18′54″E	Motichur mosque More images
S-WB-21	Siva temple	Ramnagar		Birbhum	23°52′40″N 87°51′23″E	Upload Photo
S-WB-22	Temple of Dewanji and its contiguous shrines	Hetampur		Birbhum	23°46′32″N 87°23′54″E	Temple of Dewanji and its contiguous shrines More images
S-WB-23	Temple of Chandra Nath Siva	Hetampur		Birbhum	23°46′35″N 87°23′55″E	Temple of Chandra Nath Siva More images
S-WB-24	Siva temple at Panchra			Birbhum		Upload Photo
S-WB-25	Stone Shiva Temple	Rasa		Birbhum	23°47′21″N 87°12′41″E	Upload Photo
S-WB-26	Visnu temple	Hatsarandi		Birbhum	23°37′52″N 87°49′17″E	Upload Photo
S-WB-27	Siva temple adjacent to Kali temple	Gonpur		Birbhum	24°03′59″N 87°40′21″E	Upload Photo
S-WB-28	Siva temple (Raghunatha)	Ghurisa		Birbhum	23°39′32″N 87°29′39″E	Siva temple (Raghunatha) More images
S-WB-29	Malleswar Siva temple	Mallarpur		Birbhum	24°04′35″N 87°42′06″E	Malleswar Siva temple More images
S-WB-30	Kali temple	Patharkunchi		Birbhum	23°45′25″N 87°18′51″E	Upload Photo
S-WB-31	Chand Roy temple	Uchkaran		Birbhum	23°40′28″N 87°52′33″E	Chand Roy temple
S-WB-32	Four Siva temples	Uchkaran		Birbhum	23°40′27″N 87°52′24″E	Four Siva temples More images
S-WB-33	Bhandeswara Siva temple	Bhandiswar		Birbhum	23°58′27″N 87°28′17″E	Upload Photo
S-WB-34	Madan Gopal Temple	Amadpur		Purba Bardhaman	23°12′24″N 88°05′16″E	Madan Gopal Temple More images
S-WB-35	Majlish Saheb or Id-Baqrid mosque	Kalna town		Purba Bardhaman		Majlish Saheb or Id-Baqrid mosque More images
S-WB-36	Panchratna brick temple	Baidyapur		Purba Bardhaman	23°09′39″N 88°14′55″E	Panchratna brick temple More images
S-WB-37	Radha Gobinda temple	Jagadanandapur		Purba Bardhaman	23°34′58″N 88°10′10″E	Radha Gobinda temple More images
S-WB-38	Three Siva temple	Sribati		Purba Bardhaman	23°31′32″N 88°10′15″E	Three Siva temple More images
S-WB-39	Badsahi or Hussain Shahi mosque	Nutanhat		Purba Bardhaman	23°32′17″N 87°54′16″E	Badsahi or Hussain Shahi mosque More images
S-WB-40	Siva temple	Bonpas Kamarpara		Purba Bardhaman	23°23′06″N 87°48′27″E	Siva temple More images
S-WB-41	Hussain Shah mosque	Kulutia		Purba Bardhaman	23°46′29″N 87°57′14″E	Hussain Shah mosque More images
S-WB-42	Excavated monument	Goswamikhanda		Purba Bardhaman		Upload Photo
S-WB-43	Bijoy - Toran at Burdwan town	Burdwan		Purba Bardhaman	23°14′25″N 87°52′03″E	Bijoy - Toran at Burdwan town More images
S-WB-44	Temple of Kashinath Siva	Ajhapur		Purba Bardhaman	23°08′24″N 88°03′20″E	Temple of Kashinath Siva More images
S-WB-45	Temple of Madan Gopal	Kulingram		Purba Bardhaman	23°05′25″N 88°07′05″E	Temple of Madan Gopal More images
S-WB-46	South Park street Cemetery	Park street		Kolkata	22°32′48″N 88°21′37″E	South Park street Cemetery More images
S-WB-47	The tomb of Admiral Charles Watson, the Mausoleum of Job Charnak and The Tomb of Begun Johnson within the compound of St. John's Church		2/2 Council house street	Kolkata	22°34′12″N 88°20′47″E	The tomb of Admiral Charles Watson, the Mausoleum of Job Charnak and The Tomb of Begun Johnson within the compound of St. John's Church
S-WB-47-a	The tomb of Admiral Charles Watson within the compound of St. John's Church		2/2 Council house street	Kolkata	22°34′15″N 88°20′45″E	The tomb of Admiral Charles Watson within the compound of St. John's Church More images
S-WB-47-b	The Mausoleum of Job Charnak within the compound of St. John's Church		2/2 Council house street	Kolkata	22°34′15″N 88°20′45″E	The Mausoleum of Job Charnak within the compound of St. John's Church More images
S-WB-47-c	The Tomb of Begun Johnson within the compound of St. John's Church		2/2 Council house street	Kolkata	22°34′16″N 88°20′44″E	The Tomb of Begun Johnson within the compound of St. John's Church More images
S-WB-48	Siddhanath Siva temple	Dhaliabari		Cooch Behar	26°16′48″N 89°28′07″E	Siddhanath Siva temple More images
S-WB-49	The temple of Kamteswari	Gosanimari		Cooch Behar	26°08′06″N 89°21′44″E	The temple of Kamteswari More images
S-WB-50	Baneswar Shiva temple	Baneswar		Cooch Behar	26°23′55″N 89°29′53″E	Baneswar Shiva temple More images
S-WB-51	Henry martin's Pagoda	Serampore		Hooghly	22°44′49″N 88°21′20″E	Henry martin's Pagoda More images
S-WB-52	Raj Rajeswar temple	Dwarahatta		Hooghly	22°47′36″N 88°04′00″E	Raj Rajeswar temple More images
S-WB-53	Chandi temple	Deulpara		Hooghly	22°53′36″N 87°57′10″E	Upload Photo
S-WB-54	Siva temple	Bakharpur		Hooghly	22°55′59″N 87°58′09″E	Upload Photo
S-WB-55	Temple of Gour Chandra and Krishnachandra	Chatra Serampore		Hooghly	22°45′40″N 88°20′09″E	Temple of Gour Chandra and Krishnachandra More images
S-WB-56	Jorbangla temple	Parul Arambag		Hooghly		Upload Photo
S-WB-57	Raghunandan temple	Parul Arambag		Hooghly	22°51′54″N 87°47′59″E	Raghunandan temple More images
S-WB-58	Jorbangla temple of Durga with Navaratna tower	Bali dewanganj		Hooghly	22°48′24″N 87°46′04″E	Jorbangla temple of Durga with Navaratna tower More images
S-WB-59	Jami Masjid	Bajua		Hooghly	22°56′39″N 87°43′26″E	Upload Photo
S-WB-60	Radha Govinda temple	Antpur		Hooghly	22°46′25″N 88°02′48″E	Radha Govinda temple More images
S-WB-61	Siva temple	Harirampur		Hooghly	22°42′27″N 88°04′14″E	Upload Photo
S-WB-62	Raj Rajeswar temple	Kotalpur		Hooghly	22°42′05″N 88°05′14″E	Raj Rajeswar temple More images
S-WB-63	Temple of Sri Sri Nandadulal Jiu	Gurap		Hooghly	23°02′02″N 88°06′38″E	Temple of Sri Sri Nandadulal Jiu More images
S-WB-64	The mast of a Portuguese ship	Bandal		Hooghly	22°55′08″N 88°23′45″E	The mast of a Portuguese ship More images
S-WB-65	Kanakeswar Shiva temple	Baira Kanpur		Hooghly	22°50′24″N 87°49′42″E	Kanakeswar Shiva temple More images
S-WB-66	Temple of Dadhimadhab of the Roy family	Amraguri		Howrah	22°36′30″N 87°55′23″E	Temple of Dadhimadhab of the Roy family More images
S-WB-67	Temple of Gopal Jiu	Mellock		Howrah	22°27′56″N 87°54′12″E	Temple of Gopal Jiu More images
S-WB-68	Jatileswar Temple	Purbba Dehar Maynaguri		Jalpaiguri	26°32′35″N 88°55′07″E	Jatileswar Temple More images
S-WB-69	Buxa Fort and prison on mountain cliff	Buxa		Jalpaiguri	26°45′18″N 89°34′49″E	Buxa Fort and prison on mountain cliff More images
S-WB-70	Jami mosque	Old Malda municipality		Malda	25°02′22″N 88°08′10″E	Jami mosque More images
S-WB-71	Ruins of the fortified city of Pandua	Pandua		Malda		Upload Photo
S-WB-72	Ruins of Pathan palace at Adian			Malda		Ruins of Pathan palace at Adian More images
S-WB-73	Ancient ruins at Ratnagarh at Wari			Malda		Upload Photo
S-WB-74	Nandadirghi Mahavihara	Jagjibanpur		Malda	25°02′26″N 88°24′16″E	Nandadirghi Mahavihara More images
S-WB-75	Temple of Dakshinakali	Malancha		Paschim Medinipur	22°20′56″N 87°16′33″E	Temple of Dakshinakali More images
S-WB-76	Jagannath temple	Dihibahiri		Purba Medinipur	21°50′43″N 87°46′51″E	Jagannath temple More images
S-WB-77	Jorbangla temple	Chandrakona		Paschim Medinipur	22°43′39″N 87°30′37″E	Jorbangla temple More images
S-WB-78	Shantinatha Shiva Temple	Chandrakona		Paschim Midnapore	22°44′15″N 87°31′08″E	Shantinatha Shiva Temple More images
S-WB-79	Temple of Raghunath	Radhanagar		Paschim Midnapore	22°41′16″N 87°38′34″E	Temple of Raghunath More images
S-WB-80	Temple of Radhagovinda and Radharaman Jiu	Gobindanagar		Paschim Medinipur	22°31′35″N 87°44′20″E	Temple of Radhagovinda and Radharaman Jiu More images
S-WB-81	Maharudra Siddhanath Jiu temple	Reyapara		Purba Medinipur	22°02′46″N 87°54′22″E	Maharudra Siddhanath Jiu temple
S-WB-82	Abandoned temple	Ramchandrapur		Purba Medinipur		Upload Photo
S-WB-83	Abandoned temple at Raghunath	Radhanagar		Paschim Midnapore		Upload Photo
S-WB-84	Temple of Gopinath	Radhakantapur		Paschim Medinipur	22°33′57″N 87°43′48″E	Temple of Gopinath More images
S-WB-85	Jorsiva temple	Rajangar		Purba Medinipur	22°26′20″N 87°40′14″E	Upload Photo
S-WB-86	Temple of Gopinath	Daspur		Paschim Medinipur	22°36′17″N 87°43′30″E	Temple of Gopinath More images
S-WB-87	Temple of Dandeswar	Karnagarh		Paschim Medinipur	22°30′26″N 87°21′19″E	Temple of Dandeswar More images
S-WB-88	Temple of Mahamaya	Karnagarh		Paschim Medinipur	22°30′26″N 87°21′19″E	Temple of Mahamaya More images
S-WB-89	Tomb of Nawab Sharfaraz Khan at Naginabagh	Murshidabad		Murshidabad		Tomb of Nawab Sharfaraz Khan at Naginabagh
S-WB-90	Temple of Gangeswar Siva	Baranagar		Murshidabad	24°15′16″N 88°14′32″E	Temple of Gangeswar Siva More images
S-WB-91	Siva temple	Yugwara		Murshidabad	23°55′20″N 87°54′22″E	Upload Photo
S-WB-92	Navratna temple	Sibarambati		Murshidabad	23°53′16″N 87°59′19″E	Upload Photo
S-WB-93	Ratneshwar Siva temple	Bilbari		Murshidabad	24°10′00″N 88°13′08″E	Upload Photo
S-WB-94	The house, temples and ruins associated with memory of Jagat Sett's house	Mahimapur		Murshidabad	24°12′33″N 88°15′44″E	The house, temples and ruins associated with memory of Jagat Sett's house More images
S-WB-95	Temple of Raghabeswar Siva	Dignagar		Nadia	23°19′20″N 88°27′10″E	Temple of Raghabeswar Siva More images
S-WB-96	Temple of Shyamchand	Santipur town		Nadia	23°14′23″N 88°26′29″E	Temple of Shyamchand More images
S-WB-97	Durga temple	Para		Purulia	23°30′41″N 86°30′36″E	Durga temple More images
S-WB-98	Mound	Haraktore		Purulia	23°31′31″N 86°27′14″E	Mound More images
S-WB-99	Radha Gibinda temple	Cheliyama		Purulia	23°37′01″N 86°33′11″E	Radha Gibinda temple More images
S-WB-100	Siva temple	Krosjuri		Purulia	23°22′20″N 86°44′57″E	Siva temple More images
S-WB-101	Jain temple	Pakbirra		Purulia	23°09′32″N 86°40′48″E	Jain temple More images
S-WB-102	Basudeb temple in ruins	Arsha		Purulia		Upload Photo
S-WB-103	Jain and other images in stone	Suisa		Purulia	23°11′34″N 85°54′15″E	Jain and other images in stone More images
S-WB-104	Rashmandir	Begunkodar		Purulia	23°21′10″N 86°03′31″E	Rashmandir More images
S-WB-105	Temple of Bhairab	Bindole		Uttar Dinajpur	25°46′01″N 88°10′47″E	Temple of Bhairab More images
S-WB-106	Ruins of Fort Ekdala	Bahirhatta		Uttar Dinajpur		Upload Photo

== See also ==
- List of State Protected Monuments in India for other State Protected Monuments in India
- List of Monuments of National Importance in West Bengal
