= Kotalpur, Hooghly =

Kotalpur
- Village
- Location in West Bengal, India Kotalpur (India)
- Coordinates: 22.7017°N 88.0872°E
- Country: India
- State: West Bengal
- District: Hooghly

Population (2011)
  - Total: 6,948

Languages
  - Official: Bengali, English
- Time zone: UTC+5:30 (IST)
- PIN: 712404
- Telephone/STD code: 03212
- Lok Sabha constituency: Sreerampur
- Vidhan Sabha constituency: Jangipara
- Website: hooghly.gov.in

Kotalpur is a village and a gram panchayat in the Jangipara CD block in the Srirampore subdivision of Hooghly district in the Indian state of West Bengal.

== Geography ==
Cities and towns in Chanditala I, Chanditala II and Jangipara CD Blocks in Srirampore subdivision in Hooghly district
M: municipal city/ town, CT: census town, R: rural/ urban centre,
Owing to space constraints in the small map, the actual locations in a larger map may vary slightly

=== Location ===
Kotalpur is located at 22.7017°N 88.0872°E

=== Urbanisation ===
Srirampore subdivision is the most urbanized of the subdivisions in Hooghly district. 73.13% of the population in the subdivision is urban and 26.88% is rural. The subdivision has 6 municipalities and 34 census towns. The municipalities are: Uttarpara Kotrung Municipality, Konnagar Municipality, Serampore Municipality, Baidyabati Municipality, Rishra Municipality and Dankuni Municipality. Amongst the CD Blocks in the subdivision, Uttarapara Serampore (census towns shown in a separate map) had 76% urban population, Chanditala I 42%, Chanditala II 69% and Jangipara 7% (census towns shown in the map above). All places marked in the map are linked in the larger full screen map.

== Demographics ==
According to the 2011 Census of India, Kotalpur had a population of 6,948 of which 3,484 (50%) were males and 3,464 (50%) females. Population in the age range 0–6 years was 915. The number of literate persons in Kotalpur was 4,718 (78.20% of the population over 6 years).

== Culture ==
David J. McCutchion mentions the Rajrajeswara temple as an at chala having terracotta panoramic battle scenes above the archway and smaller figures around the façade.

The Rajrajeswara temple (at Sr No S-WB-62) at Kotalpur is included in the List of State Protected Monuments in West Bengal by the Archaeological Survey of India.

== Kotalpur picture gallery ==
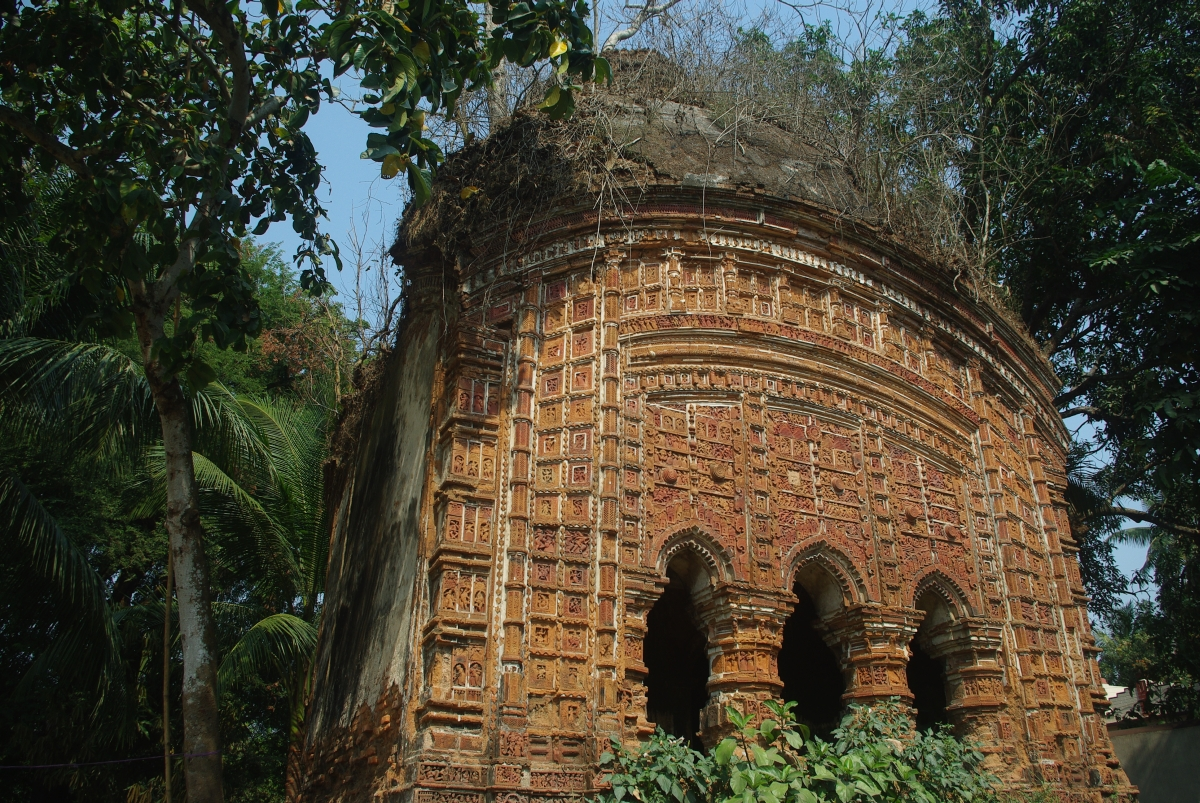
Rajrajeswara temple, photographed in 2011.

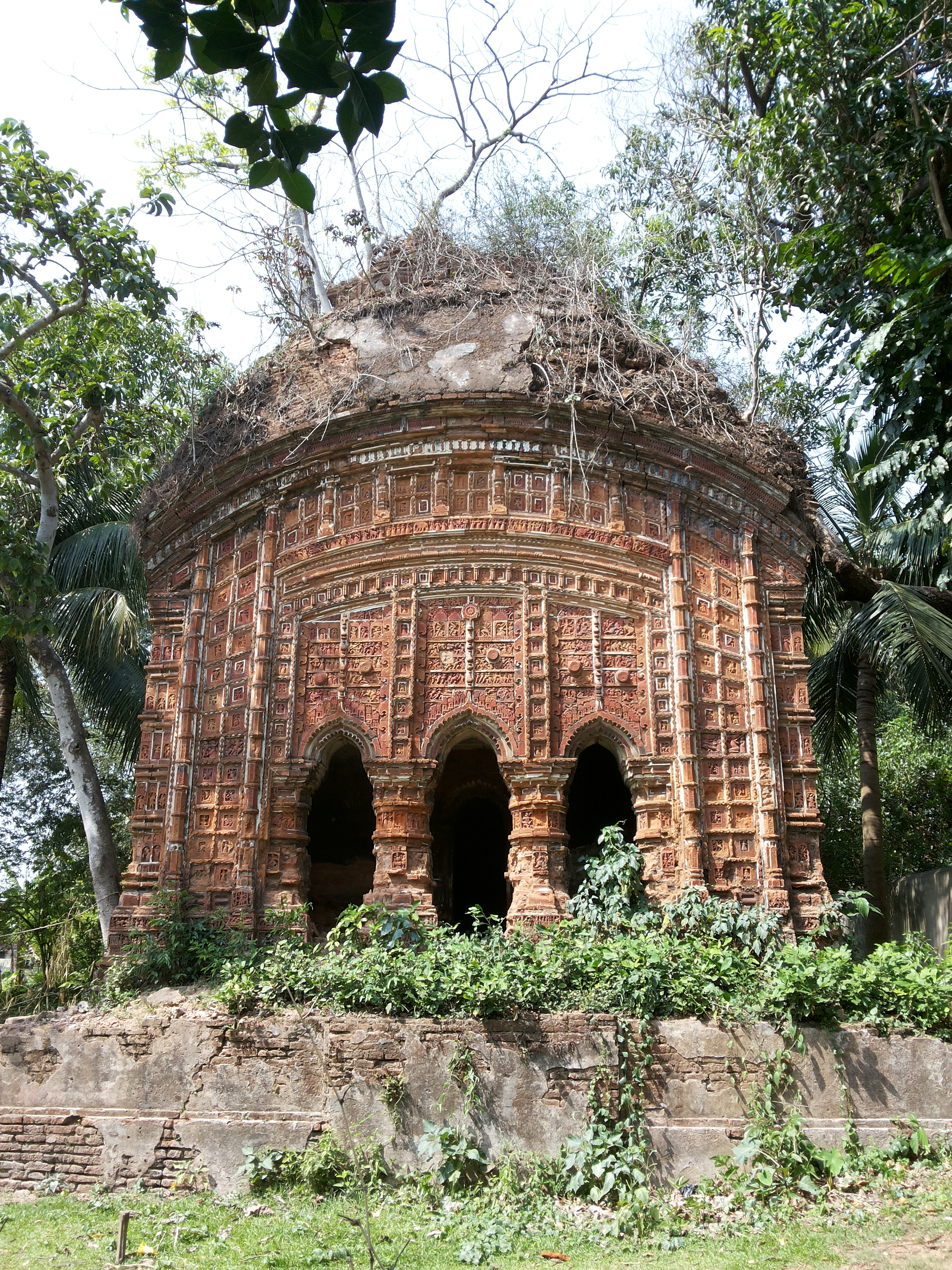
Rajrajeswara temple, photographed in 2015
