= Parvatinatha Temple =

Hindu temple in Chandrakona, West Bengal, India

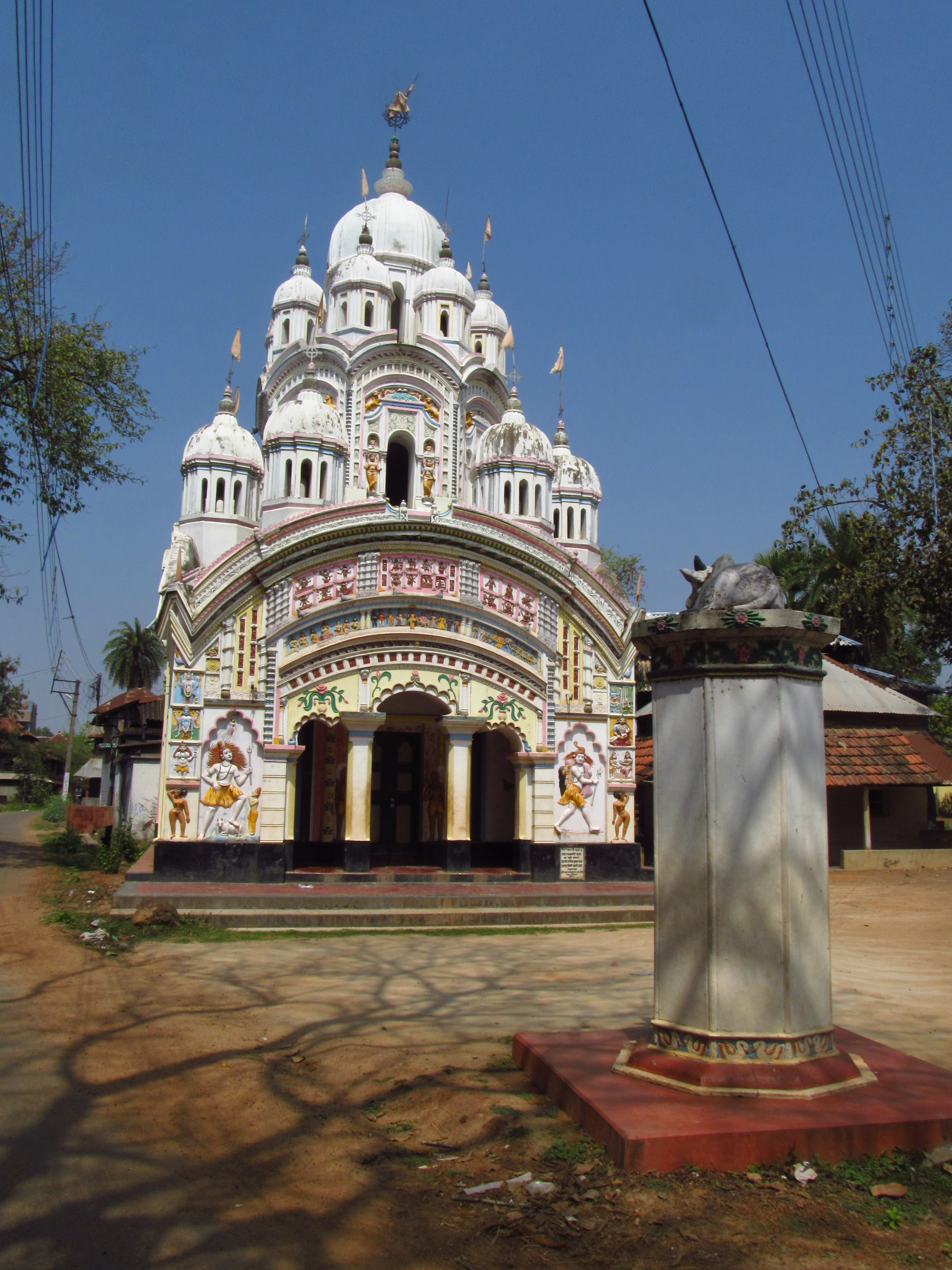
- Parvatinatha Temple

- Location within West Bengal Location within India

Religion
- Affiliation: Hinduism

Location
- Location: Chandrakona; Paschim Medinipur district
- State: West Bengal
- Country: India
- Interactive map of Parvatinatha Temple
- Coordinates: 22.7387°N 87.5098°E

Architecture
- Type: Saptadasaratna
- Completed: 18th century

The Parvatinatha Temple (also spelled as Parbatinath) is a saptadasa-ratna (seventeen-pinnacled) temple, built in the 19th century at Chandrakona in Ghatal subdivision of Paschim Medinipur district in West Bengal, India.

== History ==
According to Binoy Ghosh, it is very difficult to penetrate the hazy clouds of imagination and mythology that surround the king named Chandraketu of Chandrakona. It is popular belief in Chandrakona that Bir Bhan of the Bhan dynasty (Chouhan dynasty) overthrew the last king of the Chandraketu dynasty and became the king of Chandrakona. An English translation of the Persian book Baharistan-i-Ghaibi has recently been published. (Binoy Ghosh visited Chandrakona in 1952.)

Binoy Ghosh writes that in Baharistan-i-Ghaibi it is mentioned that Bir Bhan succeeded Chandra Bhan. This change must have taken place around mid-17th century. It is possible that Chandra Bhan became Chandra Ketu as information spread amongst the people. The stone tablet in the Lalji temple mentions that the nava-ratna temple was established by the wife of Harinarayan, daughter-in-law of Bir Bhan, Mitrasen's mother, daughter of Holray, and sister of the Malla king (of Bishnupur) Srinarayan. The construction work started in 1571 Sakabda (1649 AD) and was completed in 1577 Shakabda (1655 AD).

It was the golden age of Chandrakona when the Bhan dynasty ruled in the 17th century. Chandrakona became famous for its ‘fiftytwo markets and fiftythree lanes’. The number of temples that are still there in Chandrakona is a matter of wonder.

== Geography ==
The Parvatinatha temple is located at 22.7387°N 87.5098°E.

== The temple ==
David J. McCutchion says that the roof of a ratna temple “is surmounted by one or more towers or pinnacles called ratna (jewel). The simplest form has a single central tower (eka-ratna), to which may be added four more at the corners (pancha-ratna)”. The number of towers or pinnacles can be increased up to a maximum of twentyfive. The ratna style came up in the 15th-16th century. McCutchion classifies the Parvatinatha temple as a standard saptadasa-ratna. Built in the 19th century, it has rich terracotta and stucco decoration and measures 21’ 6” square.

Chandrakona town showcases a large 17-pinnacled Parvatinatha temple, built in 1871 and “reconstructed with no thought to its heritage value. In the process, several new plaques have been added.”

See also - Other temples at Chandrakona: Chandrakona Jorbangla Temple, Shantinatha Shiva Temple, Malleswara Shiva Temple

== Parvatinatha temple picture gallery ==
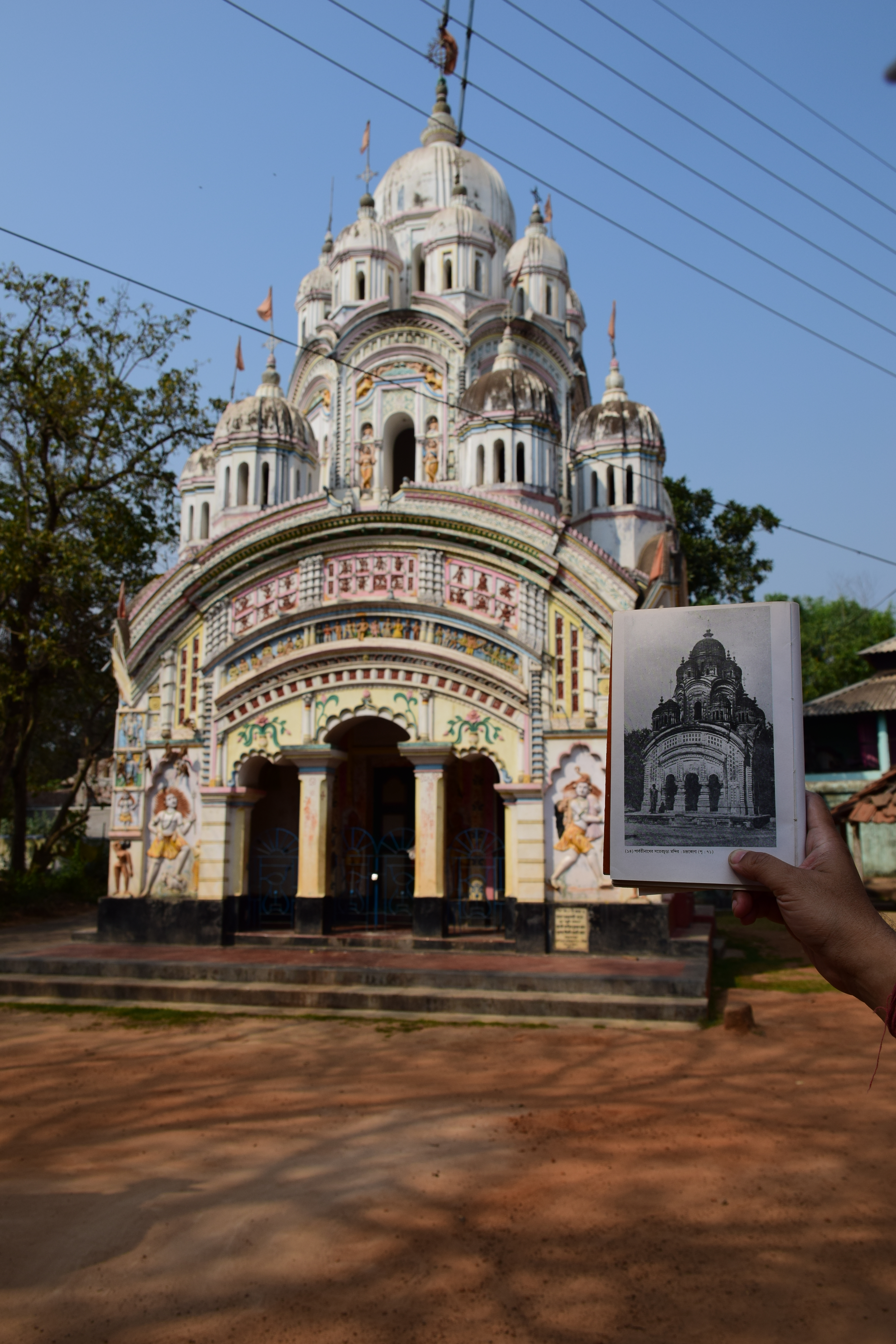

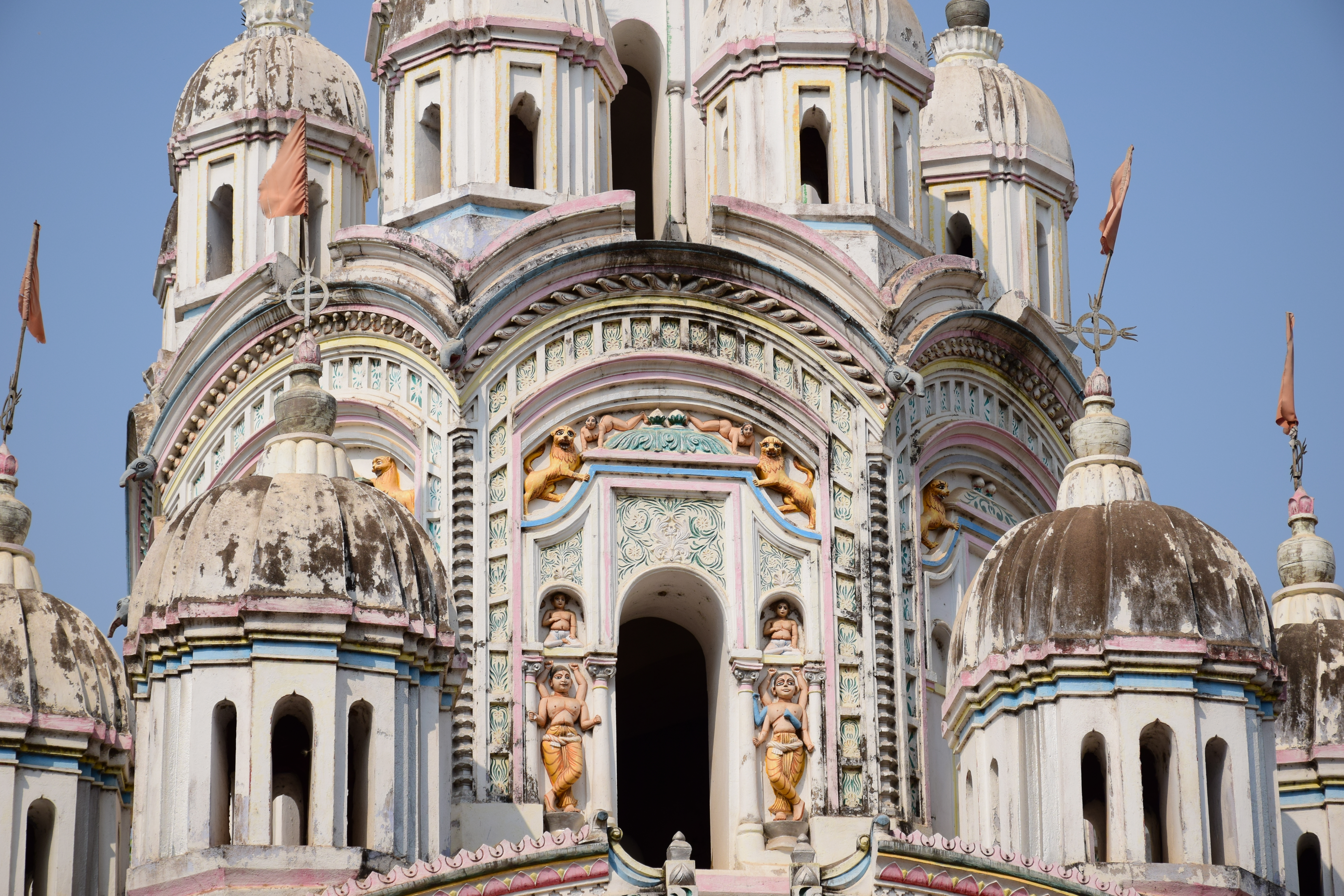

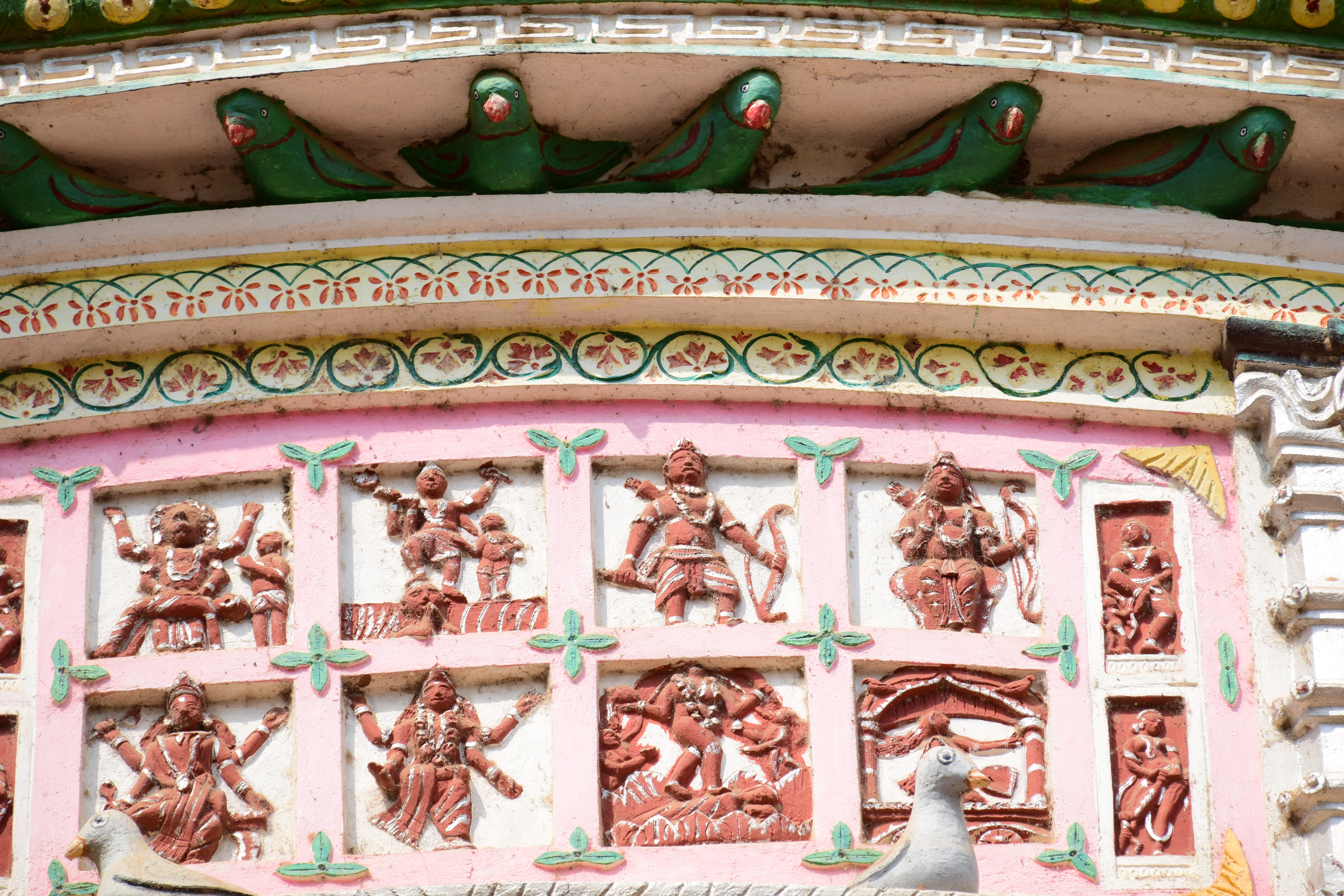

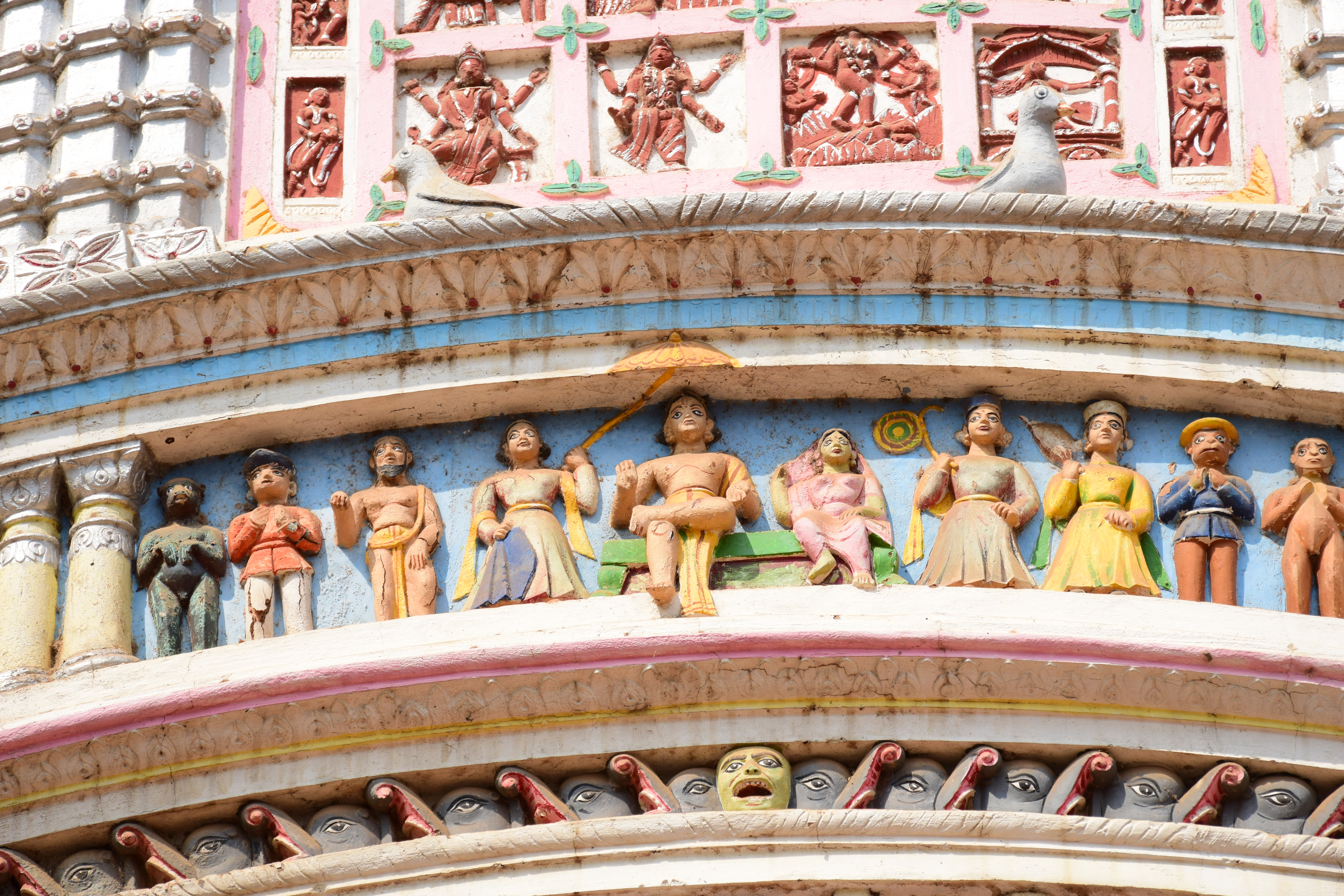
