= Chandrakona Jorbangla Temple =

Hindu temple in India

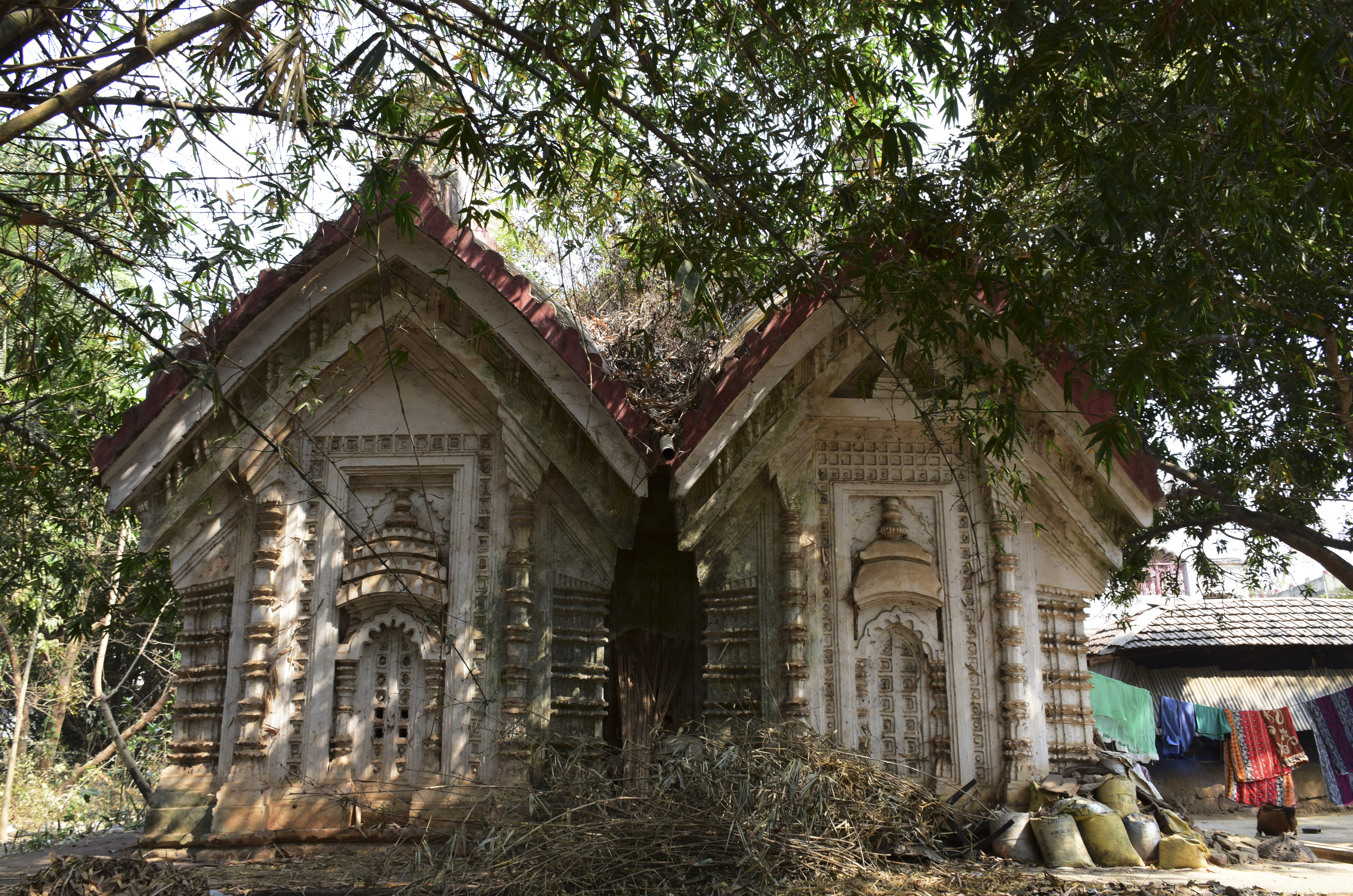
- Jorbangla temple at Chandrakona

- Location within West Bengal Location within India

Religion
- Affiliation: Hinduism

Location
- Location: Chandrakona; Paschim Medinipur district
- State: West Bengal
- Country: India
- Interactive map of Chandrakona Jorbangla Temple
- Coordinates: 22.7282°N 87.5103°E

Architecture
- Type: Jorbangla
- Completed: 17th century

Chandrakona Jorbangla Temple is a 17th-century stone built temple at Dakshinbazar, Chandrakona in Ghatal subdivision of Paschim Medinipur district in West Bengal, India.

== Geography ==
Chandrakona Jorbangla Temple is located at 22.7282°N 87.5103°E.

== The temple ==
David J. McCutchion says, “the basic forms of Bengal hut style temples may go back to time immemorial… in construction all these char-chala and at-chala temples belong to a post-Muslim tradition.” The jor-bangla possibly developed from the ek-bangla, which along with the terracotta, was popular in the construction of mazars and darghas. Chandrakona has one of the earliest jor-bangla temples. McCutchion describes the Chandrakona Jorbangla temple as a standard jorbangla, laterite built, with extensive stucco, measuring 28’ 4” x 26’, built possibly in the 17th century.

“The Jor Bangla temple style involves two structures that resemble the traditional village huts of Bengal, one that serves as a porch in front of the other, which serves as a shrine.” It is believed to have been built by the Bhan kings and has been renovated by the West Bengal State Archaeology department.

Chandrakona Jorbangla temple is a state protected monument.

== See also ==
- Shantinatha Shiva Temple
- Malleswara Shiva Temple
- Parvatinatha Temple

== Jorbangla temple picture gallery ==
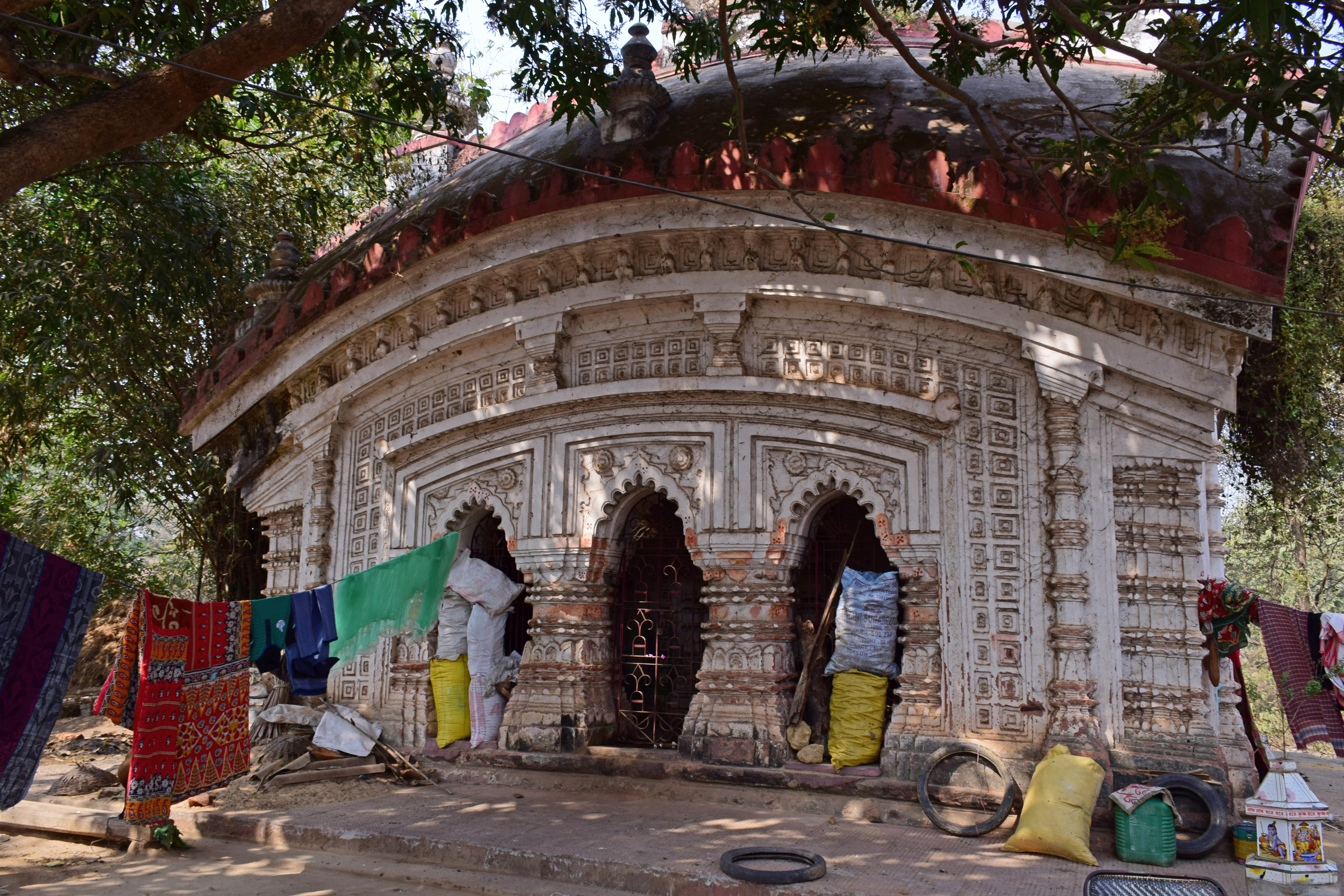

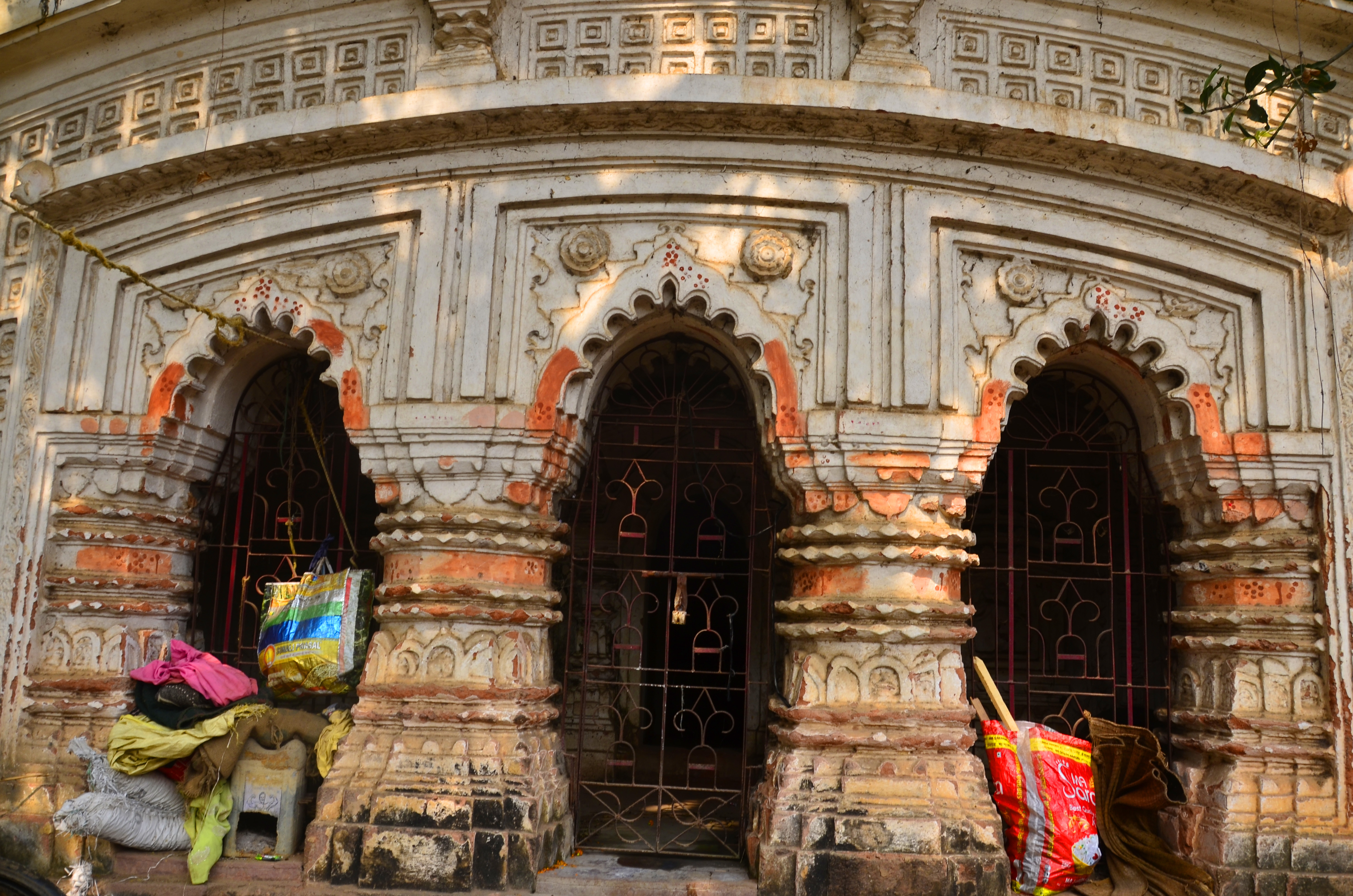

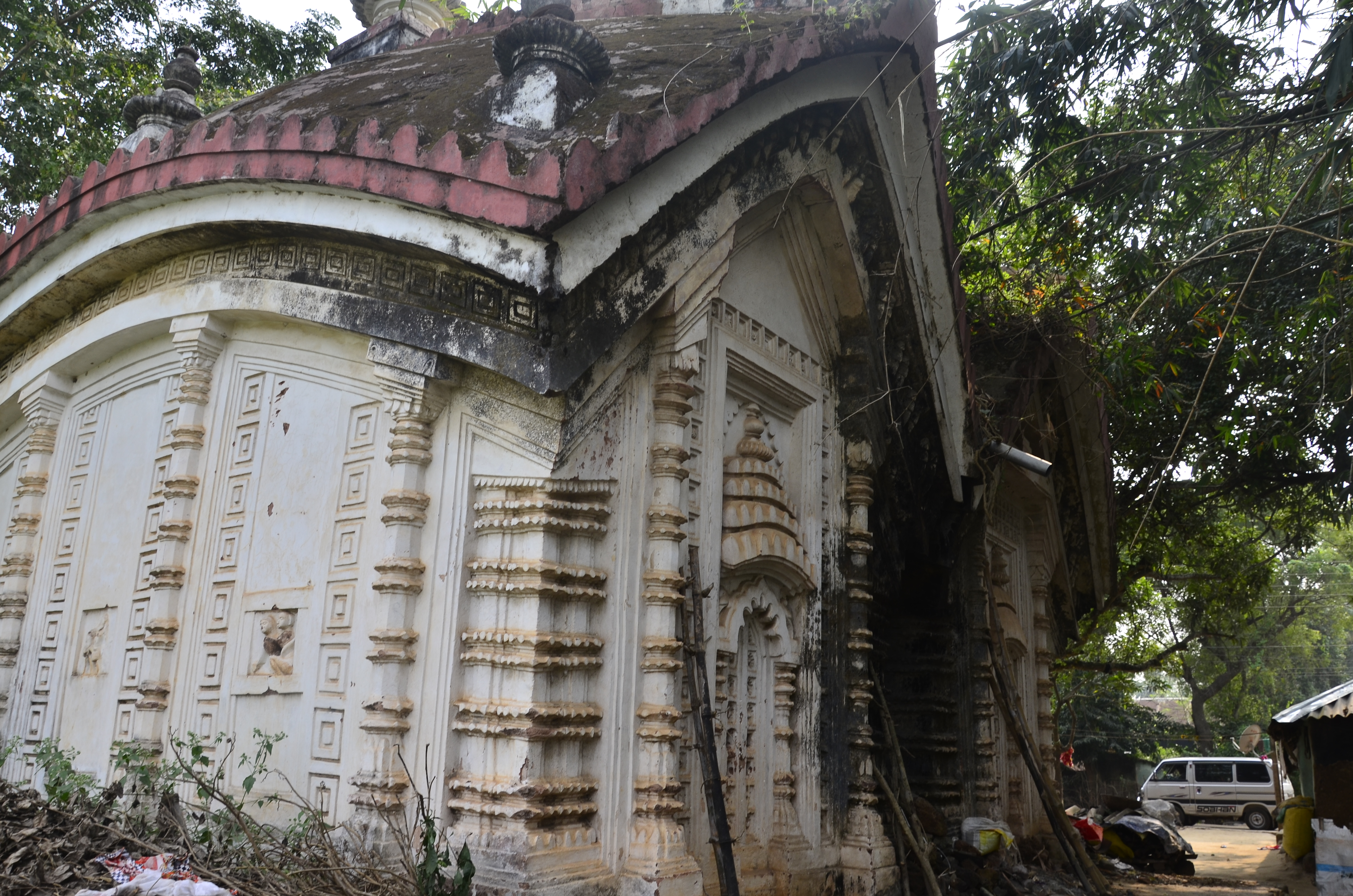

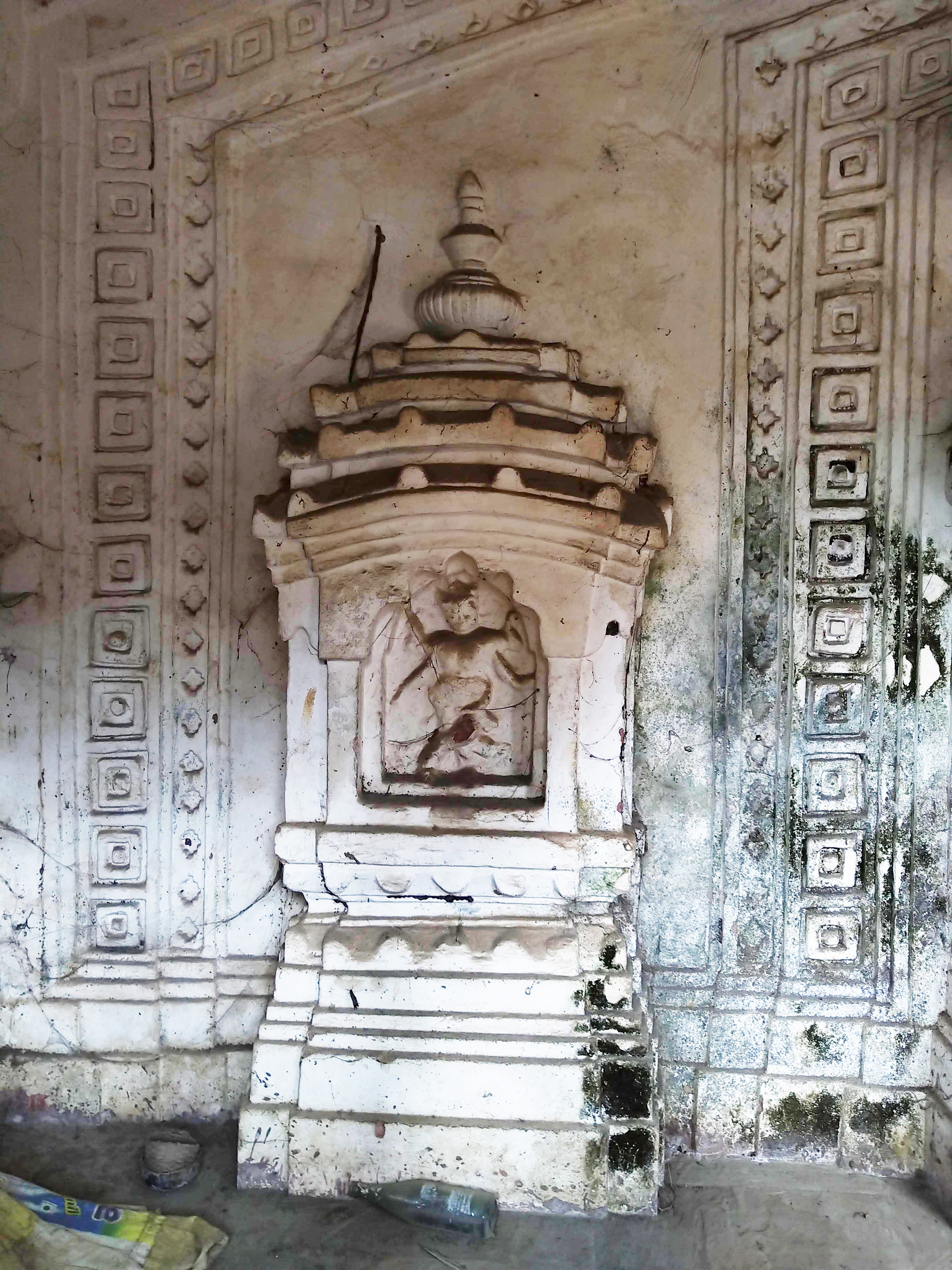

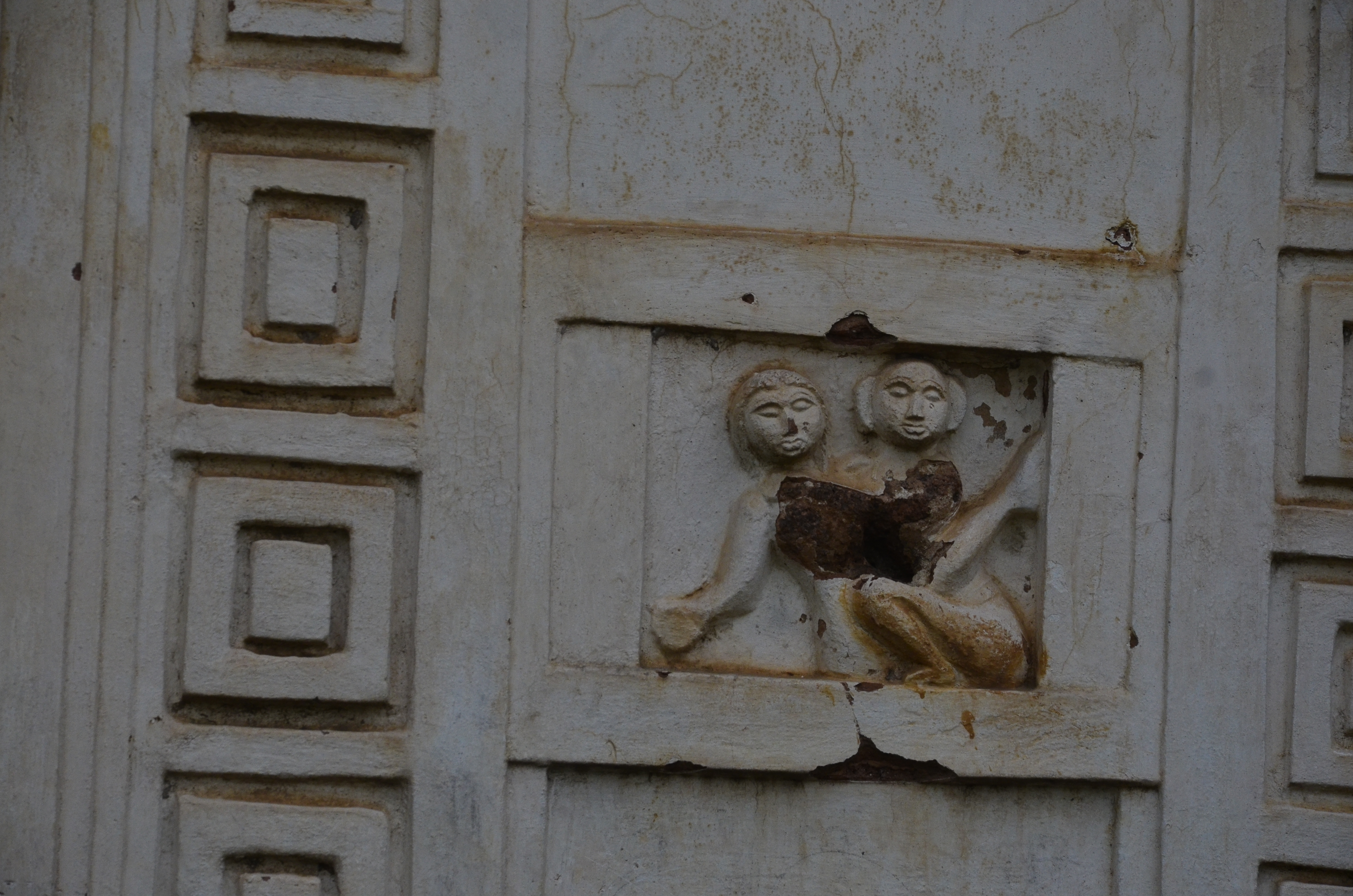
