= Shantinath Shiva Temple =

Hindu temple in Chandrakona, West Bengal in India

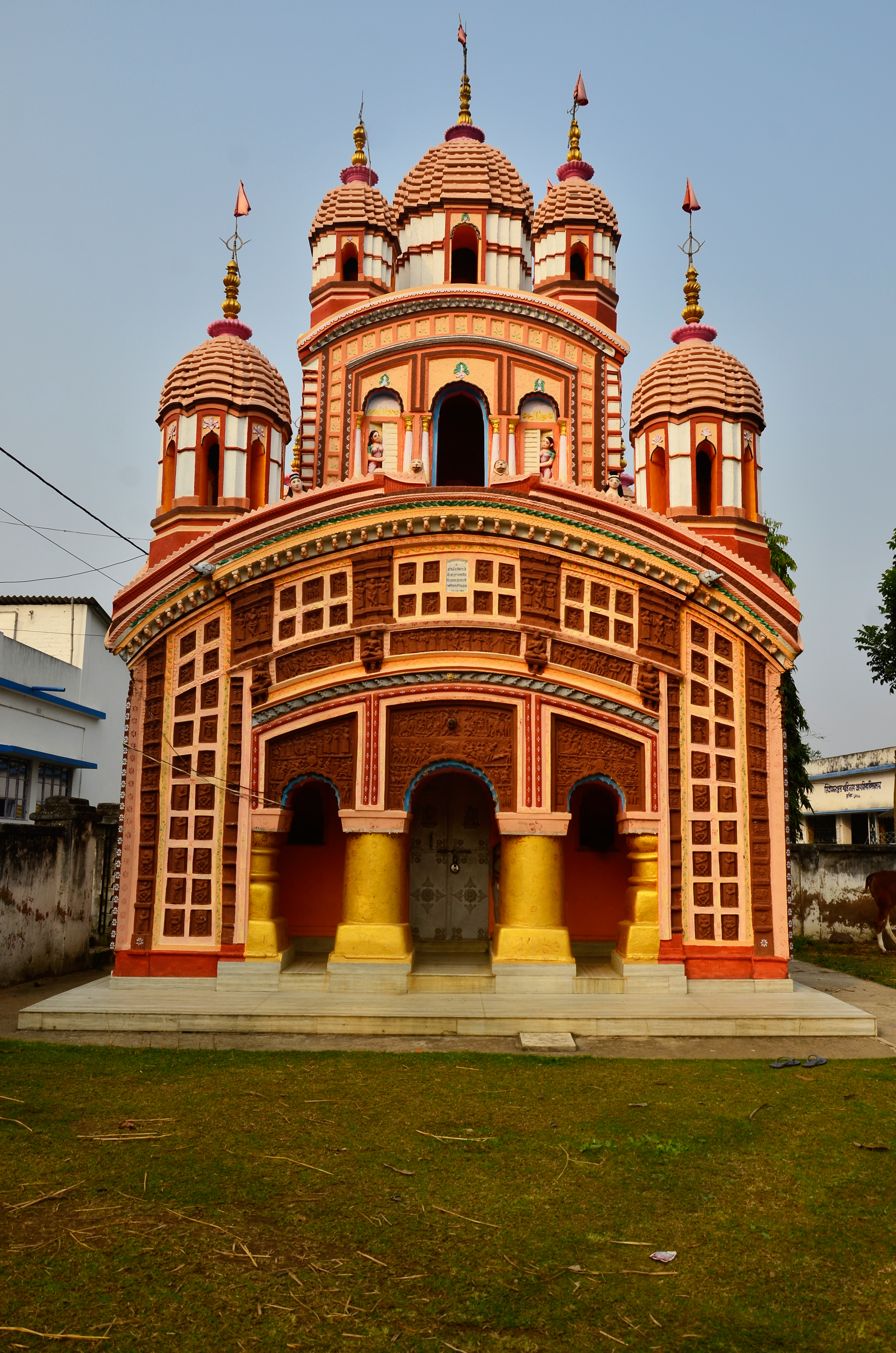
- Shantinath Shiva Temple

- Location within West Bengal Location within India

Religion
- Affiliation: Hinduism

Location
- Location: Chandrakona; Paschim Medinipur district
- State: West Bengal
- Country: India
- Interactive map of Shantinath Shiva Temple
- Coordinates: 22.7382°N 87.5189°E

Architecture
- Type: Navaratna
- Completed: 1828

Shantinath Shiva Temple is a nava-ratna temple, built in 1828 at Mitrasenpur, Chandrakona in Ghatal subdivision of Paschim Medinipur district in West Bengal, India.

== Geography ==
=== Location ===
Shantinath Shiva temple is located at 22.7382°N 87.5189°E.

== The temple ==
David J. McCutchion says that the lower structure of the pinnacled or ratna design is a rectangular box with a curved cornice. The roof follows the curvature of the cornice, and “is surmounted by one or more towers or pinnacles called ratna (jewel). The simplest form has a single central tower (eka-ratna), to which may be added four more at the corners (pancha-ratna)”. By increasing the towers or pinnacles to nine (nava-ratna), thirteen, seventeen and twentyone up to a maximum of twentyfive. The ratna style came up in the 15th-16th century. The earliest nava-ratna temples in Midnapore were probably in the Sabang area in the early 18th century. McCutchion classifies the Shantinatha Shiva temple as a West Bengal nava-ratna with ridged turrets. He mentions that at Chandrakona (both at Dakhinbazar and Mitrasenpur), the four lowest turrets are octagonal with curved ridging and the upper five pancha-ratna with straight ridging. Built in 1828, it has rich terracotta and measures 19’ 6” square.

The Shantinath Shiva temple, with nine pinnacles, has exquisite terracotta which showcases the Ramayana battles, several scenes from Krishna lila, Bhisma on a bed of arrows, Dasavtar of Vishnu, several musicians etc. Local authorities have renovated the temple using many colours. However, the details of the terracotta relief are still there.

The Shantinath Shiva temple is a state protected monument.

== Shantinath Shiva temple picture gallery ==
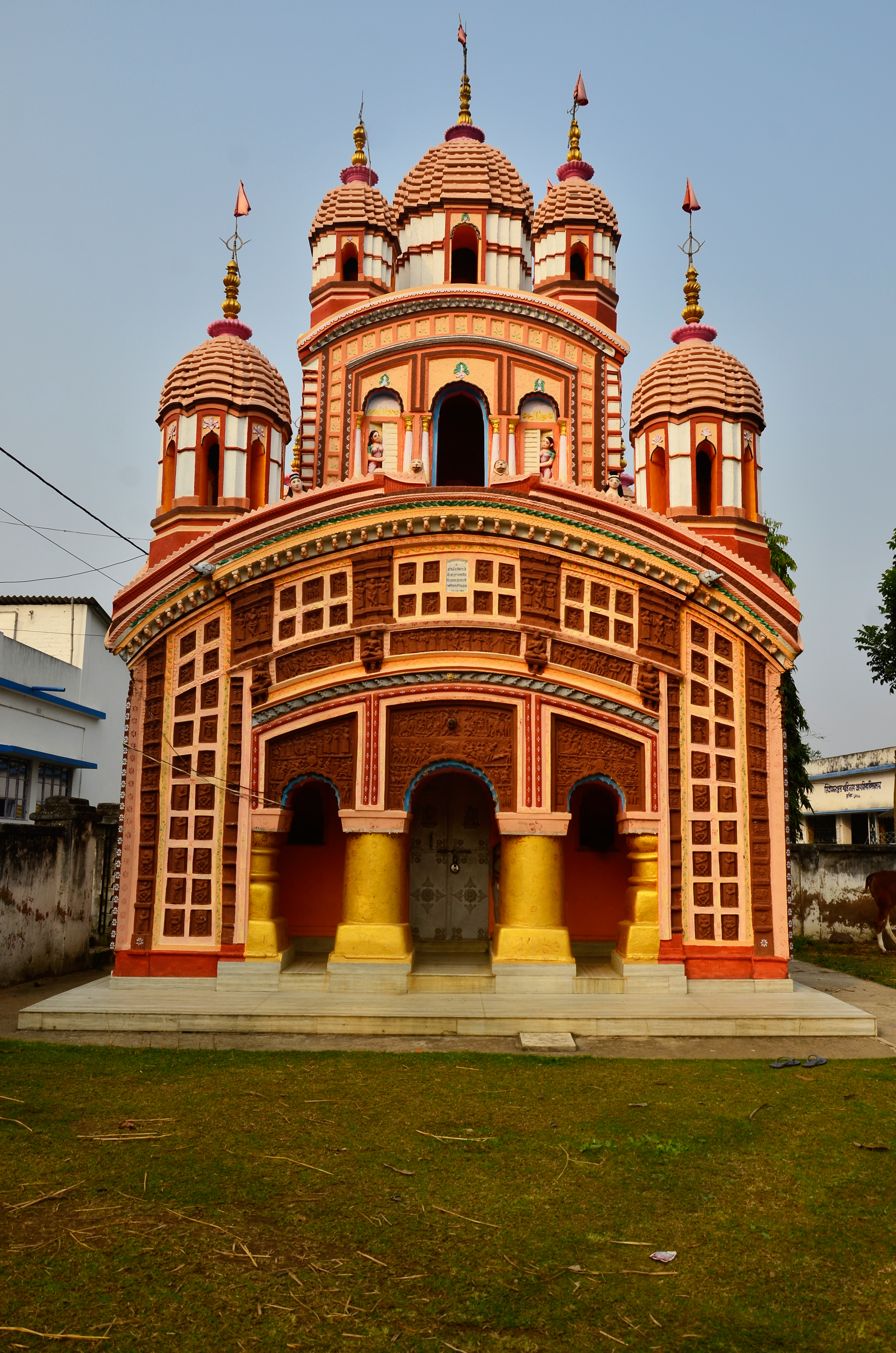

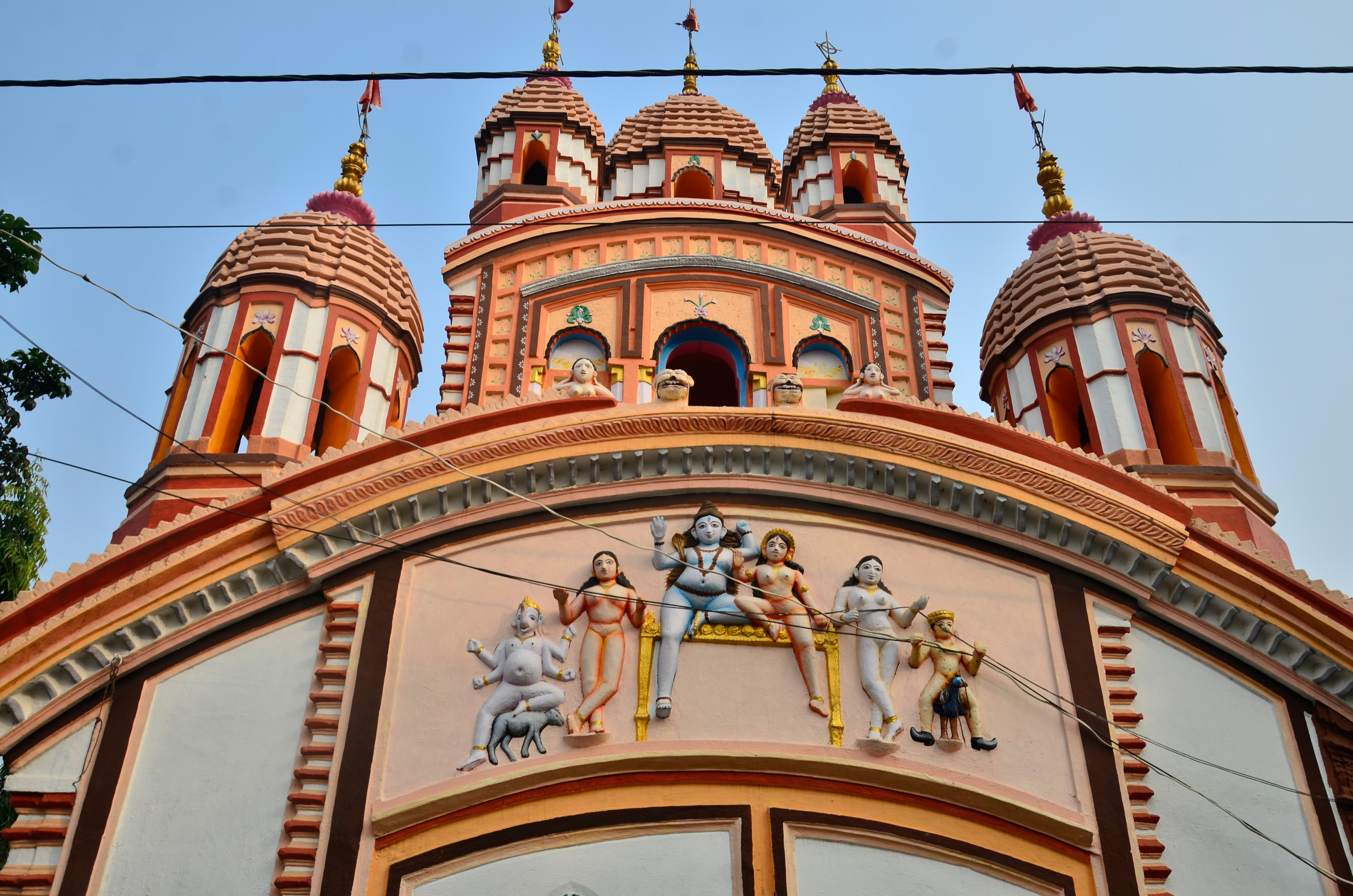

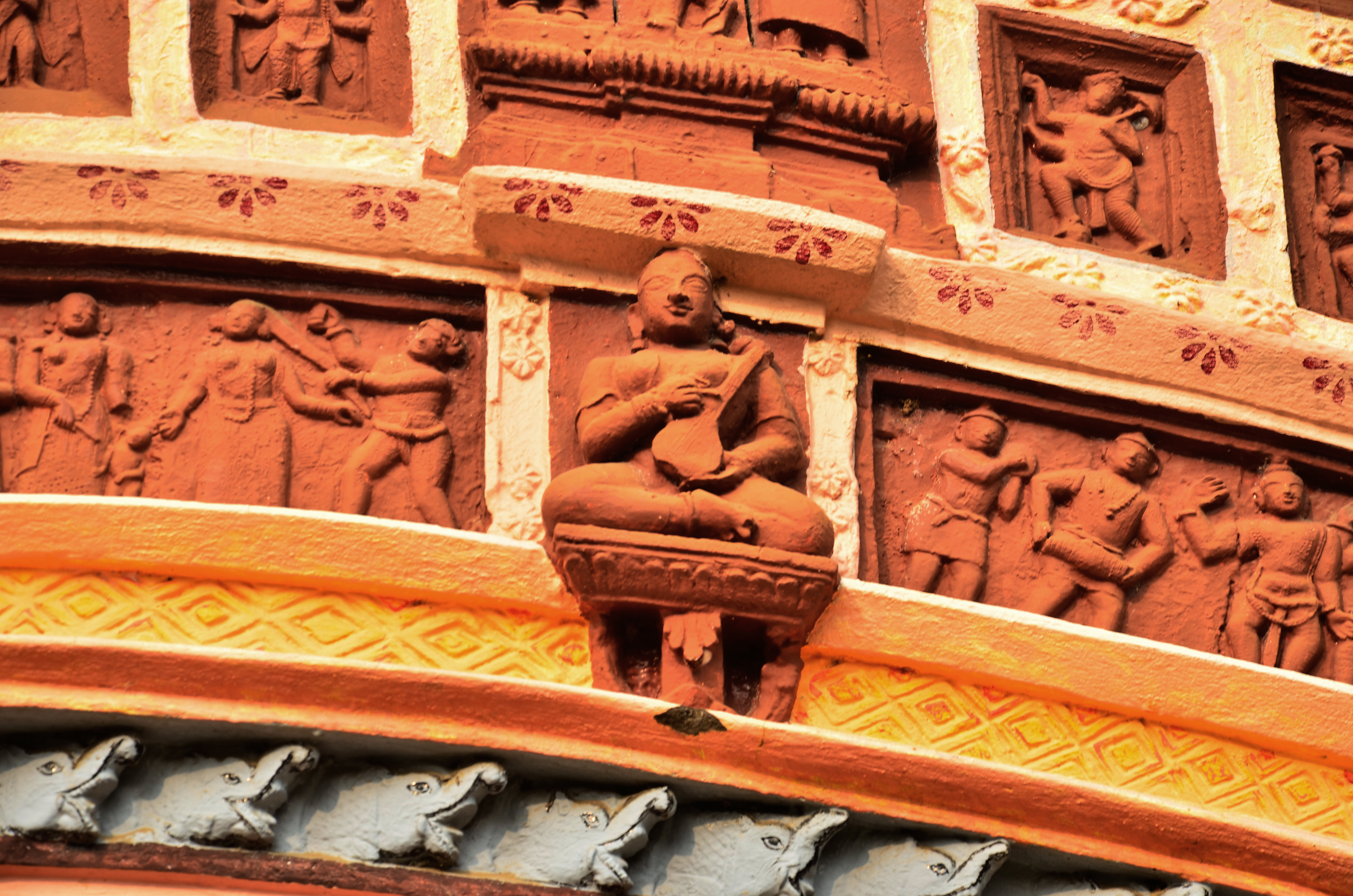

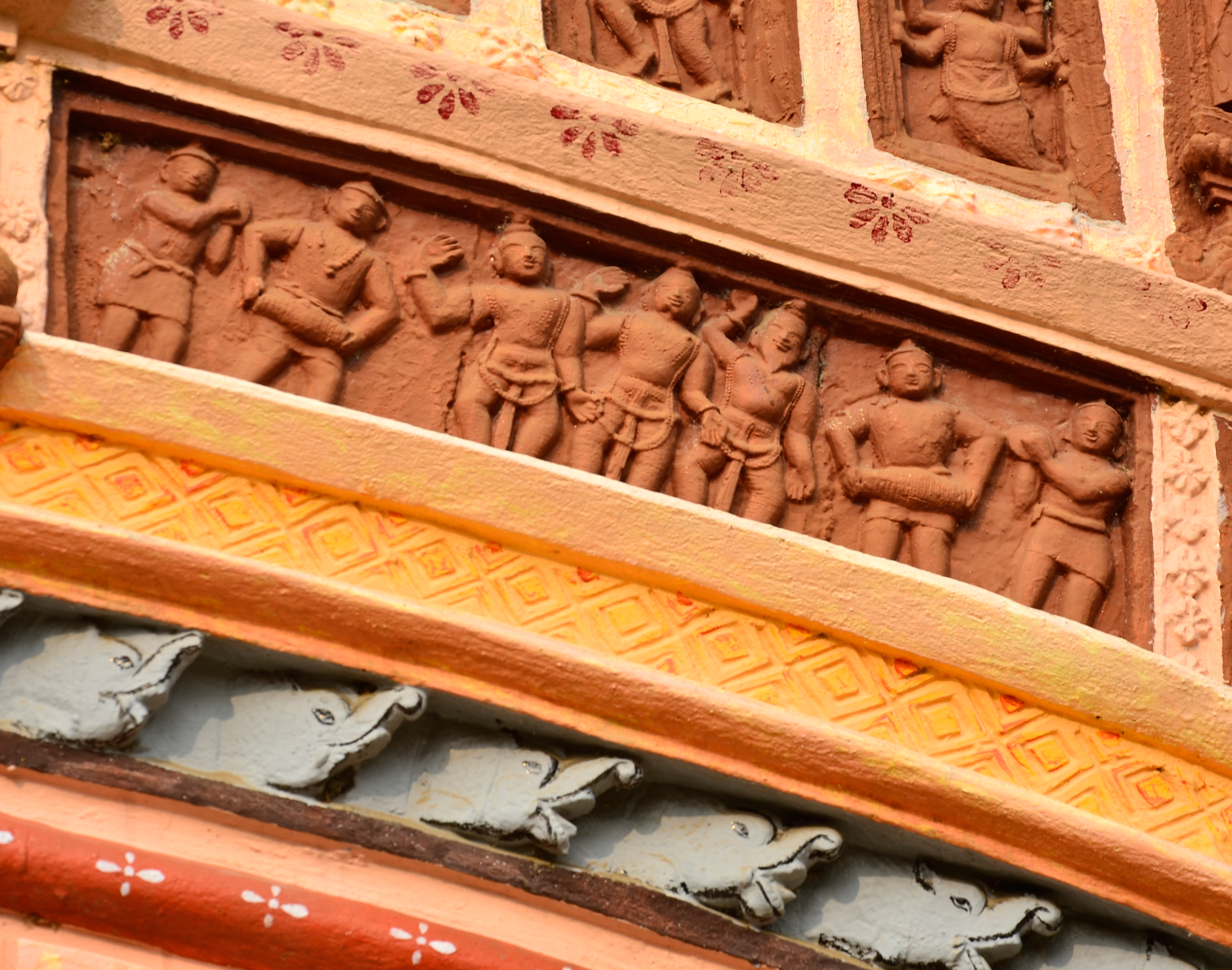

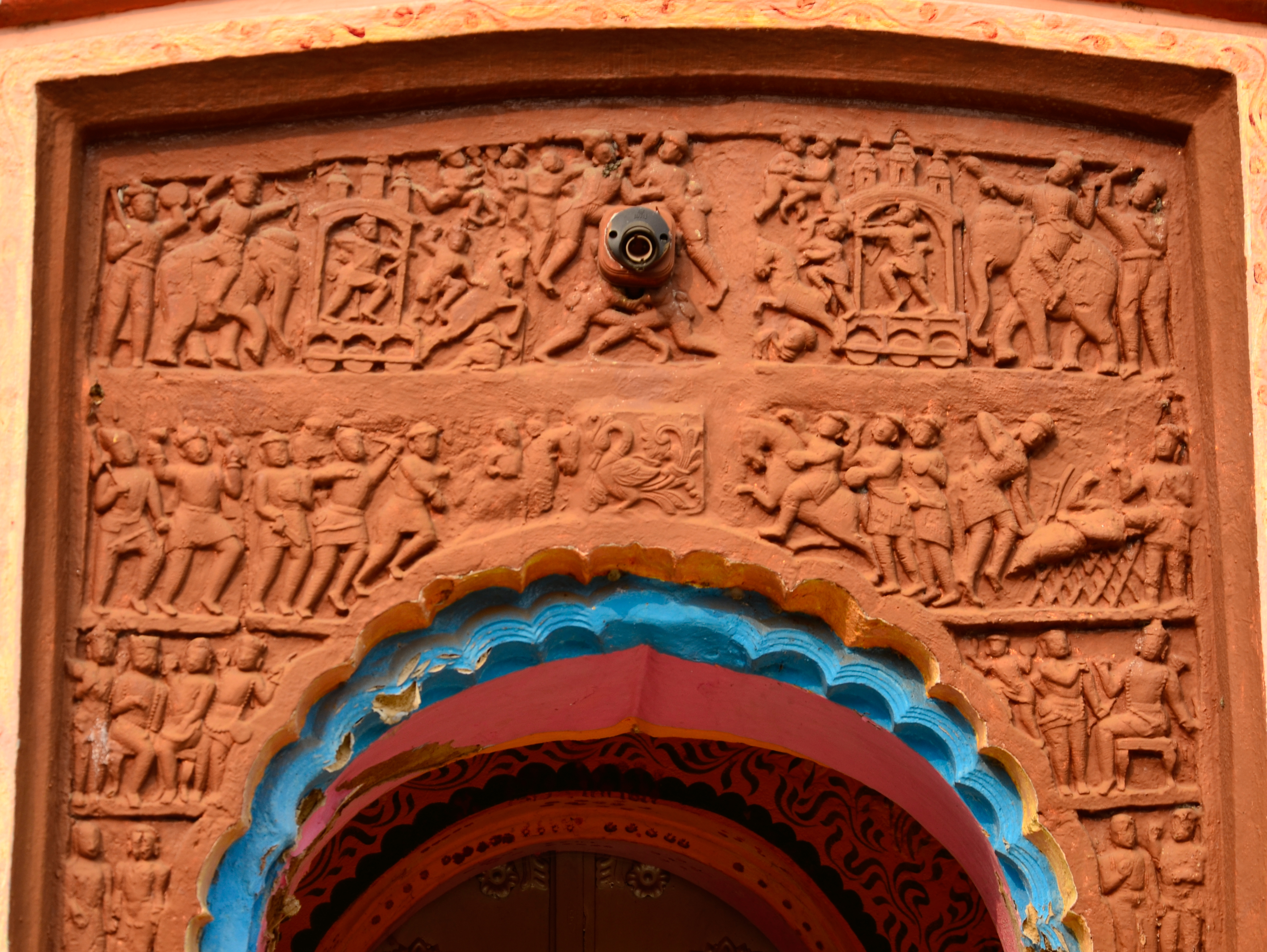

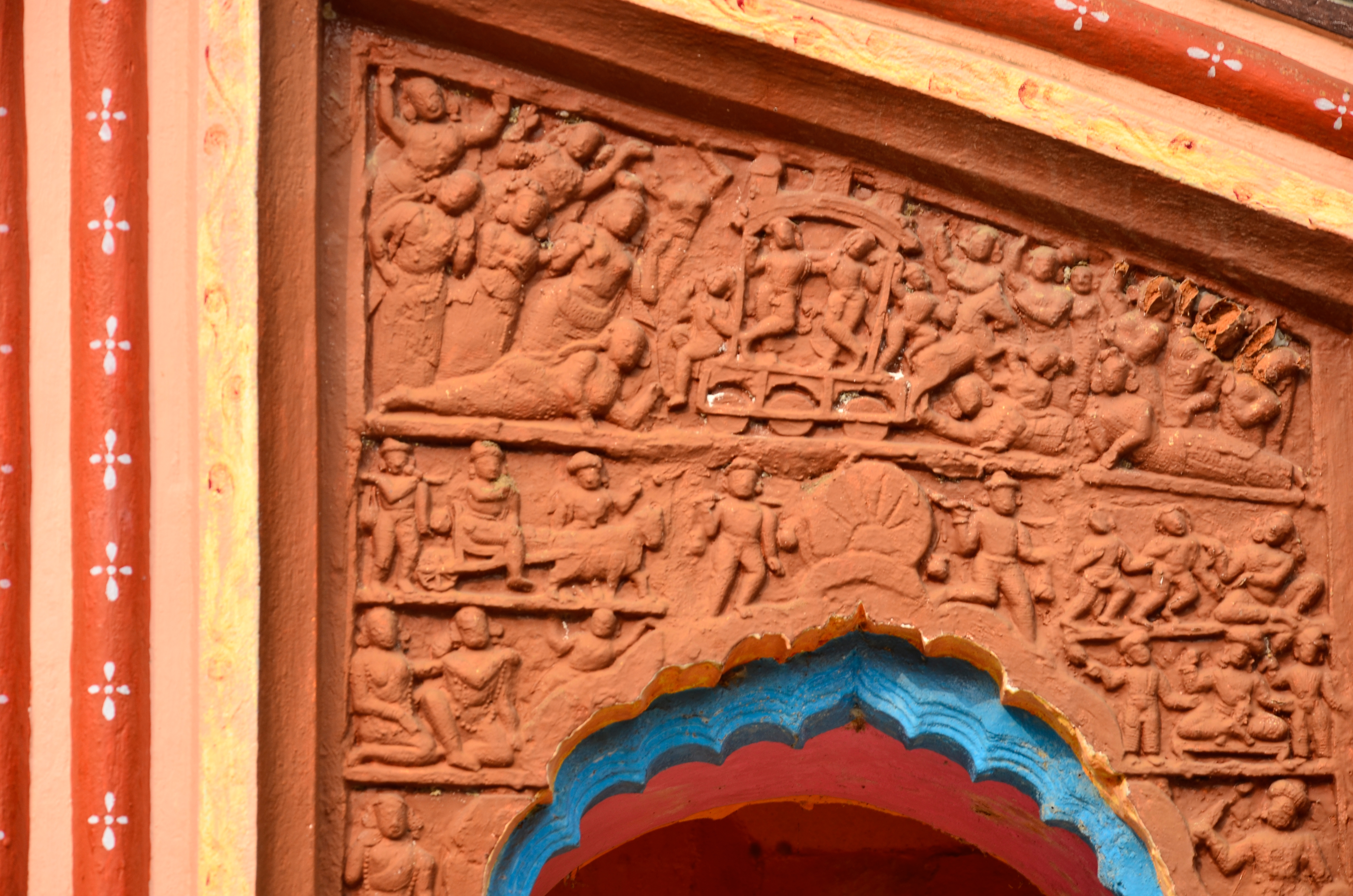

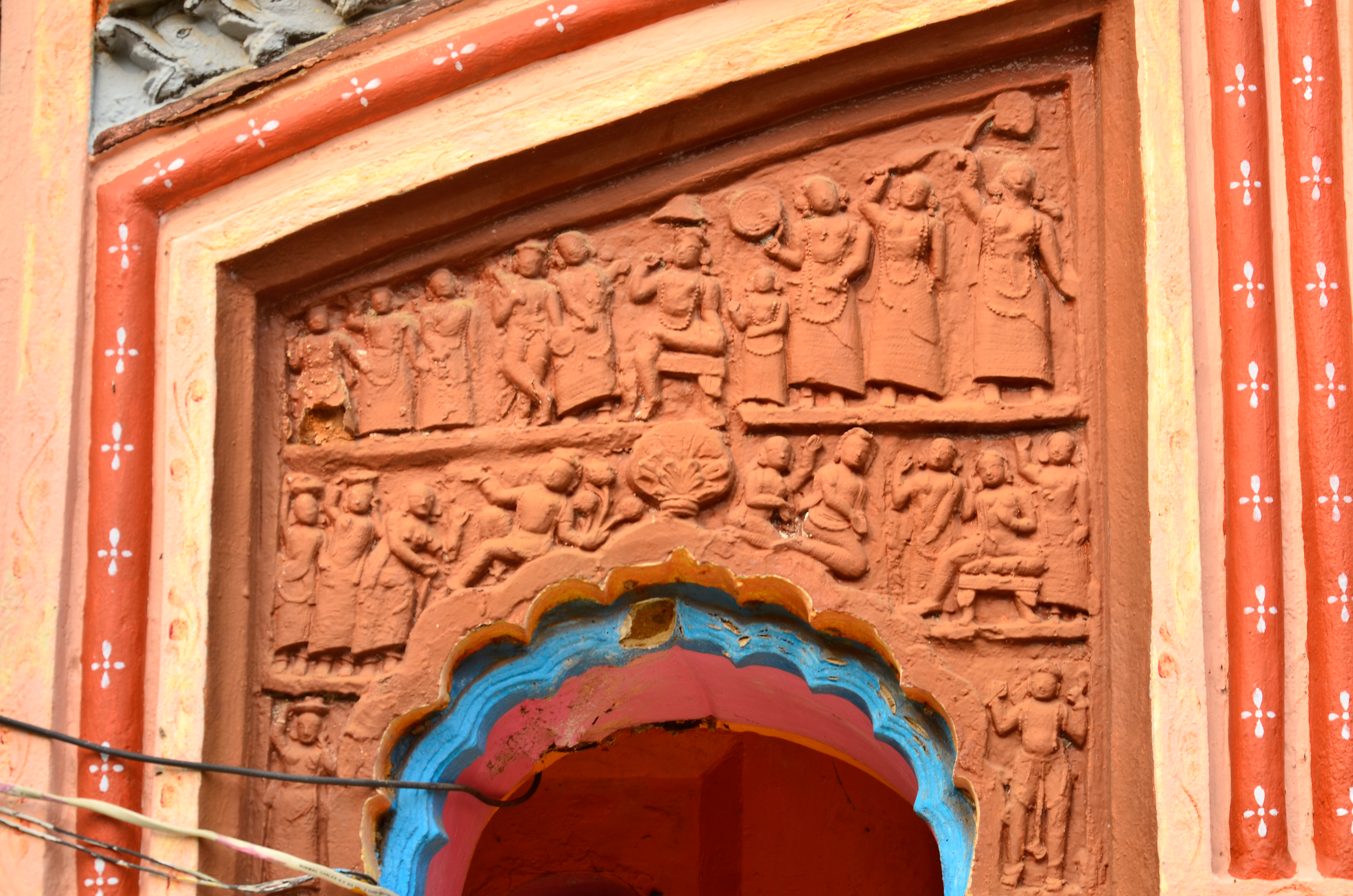

== See also ==
Other temples at Chandrakona:

- Chandrakona Jorbangla Temple
- Malleswara Shiva Temple
- Parvatinatha Temple
