= Sribati =

- Village
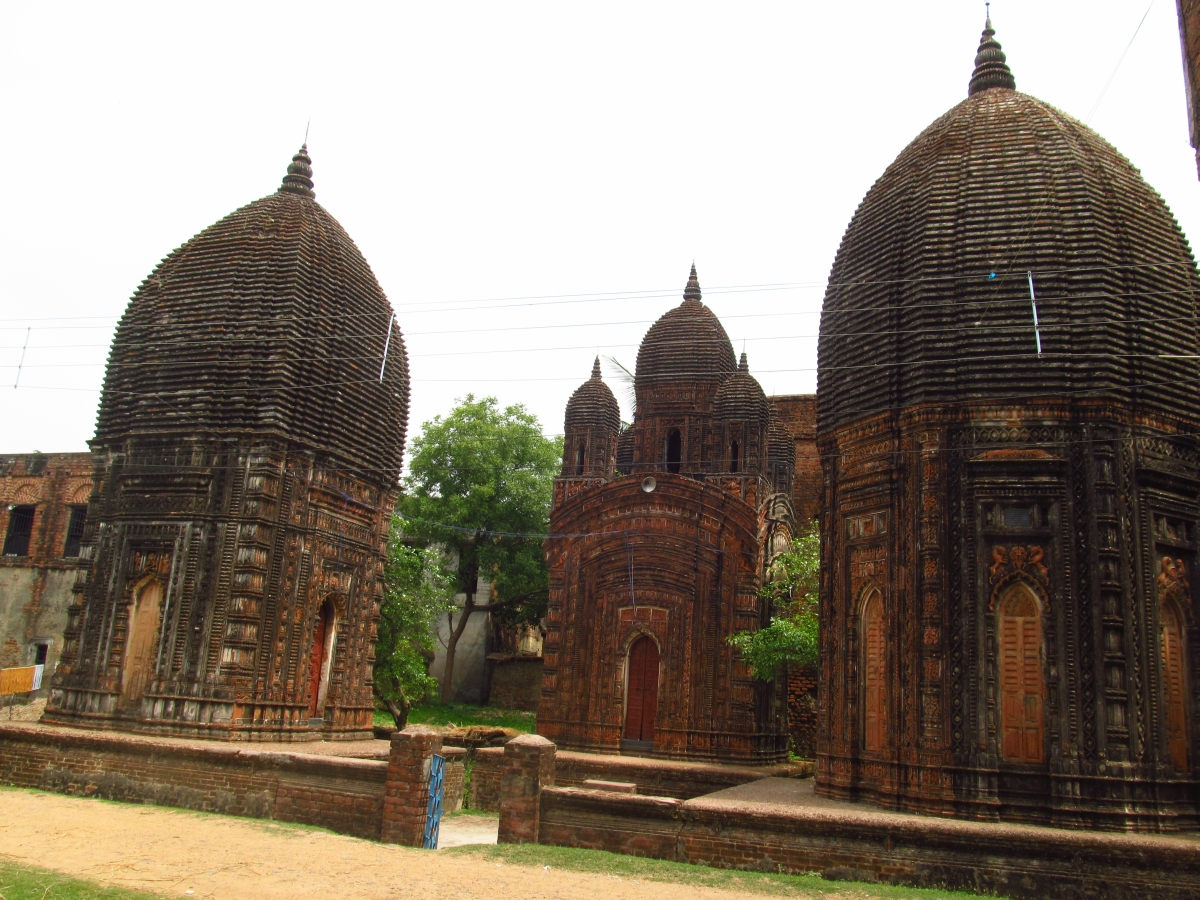

- Location within West Bengal Location within India
- Coordinates: 23.521280°N 88.178632°E
- Country: India
- State: West Bengal
- District: Purba Bardhaman
- CD Block: Katwa II

Government
  - Type: Panchayati raj (India)
  - Body: Sribati Gram Panchayat

Area
  - Total: 186.42 ha (460.7 acres)
- Elevation: 18 m (59 ft)

Population (2011)
  - Total: 2,656
  - Density: 1,425/km^{2} (3,690/sq mi)
- Time zone: UTC+5:30 (IST)
- PIN: 713514
- Website: purbabardhaman.gov.in

Sribati or Sreebati is a village and gram panchayat in Katwa II CD block in the Katwa subdivision of Purba Bardhaman district of West Bengal.

== Geography ==
Cities and towns in the Katwa subdivision of Purba Bardhaman district
M: municipal city/ town, CT: census town, R: rural/ urban centre, H: historical place/ religious and/ or cultural centre, C: craft centre.
Owing to space constraints in the small map, the actual locations in a larger map may vary slightly

=== Location ===
Sribati is located on a slightly raised plateau between the Brahmani River to the north and the Khari River to the south, at an elevation of 18 meters.

=== Urbanisation ===
88.44% of the population of Katwa subdivision live in the rural areas. Only 11.56% of the population live in the urban areas. The map alongside presents some of the notable locations in the subdivision. All places marked in the map are linked in the larger full screen map.

== Demographics ==
Sribati has a population of 2,656 of which 1,352 are males while 1,304 are females as per Population Census 2011. The population of children below the age of 6 is 314 which makes up 11.82% of total population of village. Average Sex Ratio of Sribati is 964 which is higher than West Bengal state average of 950. Child Sex Ratio for Sribati is 1026, higher than West Bengal average of 956.

Many villagers are from Scheduled Castes. Schedule Castes constitute 43.15% of the total population, whereas Scheduled Tribes constitute 0.11% of the total population.

In 2011, literacy rate of Sribati was 64.35% compared to 76.26% of West Bengal. In Sribati, male literacy stands at 70.68% while female literacy rate was 57.73%. Sribati has one high school, Sribati G.K. High School, which provides education up to the tenth standard.

== Economy ==
The majority of the village is engaged in agricultural work. Out of 868 working adults in the village, 114 were cultivators (owner or co-owner) while 427 were agricultural laborers.

== Government ==
Sribati is administered by the Sribati Gram Panchayat, led by an elected Sarpanch.

== Attractions ==
=== Terracotta Temple Complex ===
Sribati is home to one of the best preserved Bengali terracotta temple complexes from the nineteenth century. The complex consists of three temples housing Shiva-lingas named: Shri Viswesara (made of black stone), Shri Bholanath (made of white marble), and Shri Chandreswar (made of black stone).

The oldest of the temples, dedicated to Shri Chandreswar, was built in 1802 by Smt. Bhabanicharan Chandra. It was built in the rekh-deul style of Eastern India with a single spire and a square base, and decorated with terracotta reliefs from Hindu Puranic mythology including the Dashavataras, Dasha-mahavidyas and Ramlila.

The middle temple and the third temple, dedicated to Shri Bholanath and Shri Viswesara, were built in 1836, by members of the local zamindari Chandra family, Shri Ramkanai Chandra and his wife, Annapurna Devi. The middle temple was built in the pancharatna style with five spires and decorated with terracotta interweaving Shaivite, Vaishnavite and Tantric motifs. The third temple was built in the rekh-deul style with a single spire and an octagonal base, and decorated with terracotta reliefs displaying common socio-cultural scenes of that time.

The Sribati Terracotta Temple Complex (S-WB-38) is a State Protected Monument under the Archaeological Survey of India's Kolkata circle.

=== Other Attractions ===
Near the terracotta temple complex are eighteenth and nineteenth-century zamindari mansions, in various states of preservation, displaying exquisite architectural motifs representative of the colonial era in Bengal: open courtyards, hanging balconies, surrounded by up to three floors of living spaces. Many of the houses also contain a very high-ceilinged puja mandap or large hall on one side, with designs etched into the walls. One of the houses still hosts an annual Durga Puja, that has been held continuously for over 300 years.

Another attraction is the Shri Shri Raghunath Jiu Mandir, established in 1705. The mandir or temple is dedicated to the kuladevata of the local zamindari Chandra family, Shri Raghunath Jiu, a form of Vishnu. The shaligram in this temple was one of the treasures looted by Maratha general, Bhaskar Pandit, in 1742 during the Maratha invasions of Bengal.
