= Sribati G.K. High School =

Location
- Sribati, Purba Bardhaman, West Bengal 713514; India
- Coordinates: 23.525374°N 88.170013°E

Information
- Former name: Shribati Vidyamandir
- School type: Public
- Established: 1867
- Faculty: 12
- Years offered: Kindergarten – Class X
- Enrollment: 570

Sribati G.K. High School (Bengali: Sribati Gokul Krishna Uchchavidyalaya) is a government high school located in Sribati, Katwa II, Bardhaman District, West Bengal, India. Established in 1867, it is one of the oldest schools in the area, and offers co-educational classes up to the tenth grade. It is the only educational institution in Sribati.

== History ==
Sribati G.K. High School, originally called 'Sribati Vidyamandir' was the brainchild of Shri Gokul Krishna Chandra, a prominent citizen of Sribati (1836–1893), and a member of Sribati's prominent Chandra family. Initially, the school only served as a primary school, starting with kindergarten. To encourage local families to send their children to school, Mr. Chandra instituted a mid-day meal program offering a lunch of sweetened puffed rice-cakes and bananas to students. This far-sighted innovation resulted in a large increase in the number of students attending the school. Upon the passing of Mr. Chandra in 1893, the school was rechristened in his honor as 'Sribati Gokul Krishna Vidyamandir'.

The school continued to grow with the aid of donors including the Maharaja of Cossimbazar, Manindra Chandra Nandy, who provided financial aid and Mr. Banbihari Chandra, the fifth son of Mr. G.K. Chandra, who took on primary responsibility for the school's operations. Around 1895, the school building was improved and the school was commissioned to provide education up to the sixth grade. On 21 November 1953, the school was extended to eighth grade. The school was transformed into its modern form as a high school on 13 November 1986, when the government extended the school to tenth grade.

== Extracurricular Activities ==
Every year on 20 Poush in the Bengali calendar (roughly early-January) the school observes its Foundation Day, with students engaging in various extracurricular and cultural activities. In a nod to the school's founding and tradition, a lunch of sweetened puffed rice-cakes and bananas is offered to students on this day.
