= Nandadirghi Mahavihara =

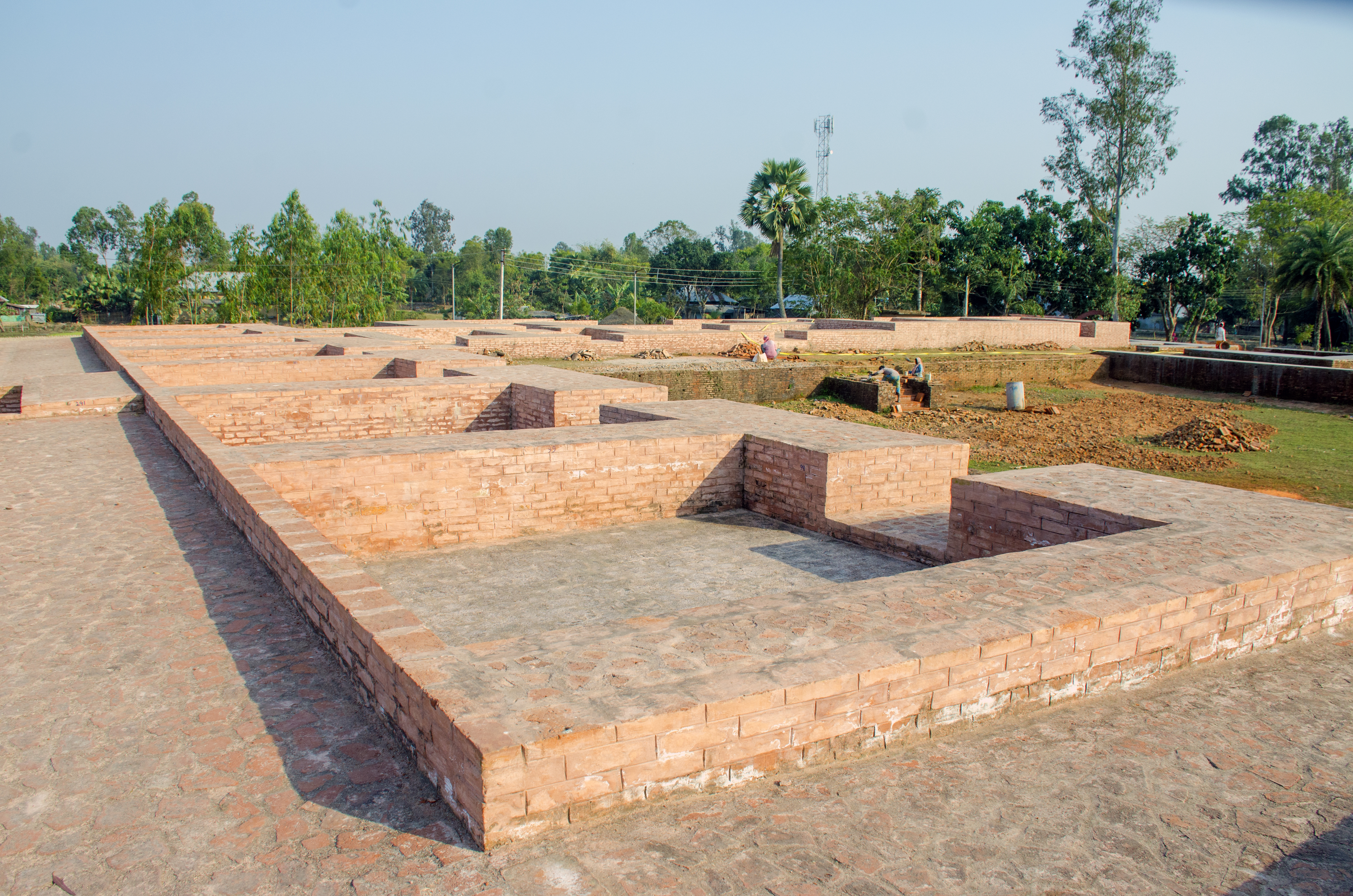
- The ruins of Nandadirghi Mahavihara

- Location within West Bengal
- 25.042423°N 88.403634°E
- Type: Mahavihara
- Location: Malda district, West Bengal, India
- Region: Bengal

History
- Built: 9th century

Site notes
- Excavation dates: 1995–1996, 1996–1997, 1997–98, 1998–1999
- Condition: In ruins
- Owner: Government of West Bengal
- Public access: Yes

Nandadirghi was a Buddhist mahavihara in ancient and medieval Bengal. Considered one of the centers of learning in ancient Bengal, it is located at Jagjivanpur village, 41 kilometres (25 mi) east of present-day Malda city by road. The almost square-style mahavihara, Nandadirghi, founded in the 9th century, a similar style was followed in other viharas of eastern India, such as Lalitgiri in Odisha.

Nandadirghi was founded in the 9th century during the reign of the Pala Empire. The mahavihara continued to flourish with the patronage of the rulers of the Pala Empire.

== Architecture ==
Nandadirghi Mahavihara is a Buddhist monastery complex. Located on the banks of the ancient Tongil River, it is considered one of the Buddhist-religious structures in Bengal.

=== Site and plan ===
The Nandadirghi is a combination of the open courtyard—the area surrounding the central building or monastery structure—and the courtyard planned at the center of the central structure. The open courtyard surrounding the central monastery structure was protected by a moat. The vihara is oriented towards the east, and the Vedi (altar) inside is also oriented towards the east and main entrance. The quadrangle of the structure has bastion-cum-cells, this type of vihara design can also be observed in Vikramashila Mahavihara. All these cells had access initially, but were later closed.

=== Features ===
==== Outer enclosure ====
Although its excavated ruins cover an area of only 9432 square meters today, the Nandadirghi Mahavihara occupied a much larger area during the medieval period. The mahavihara complex was surrounded by a moat, the ditch of which is extant today. Most of the area of the complex is used as human settlement and agricultural land.

==== Central structure ====
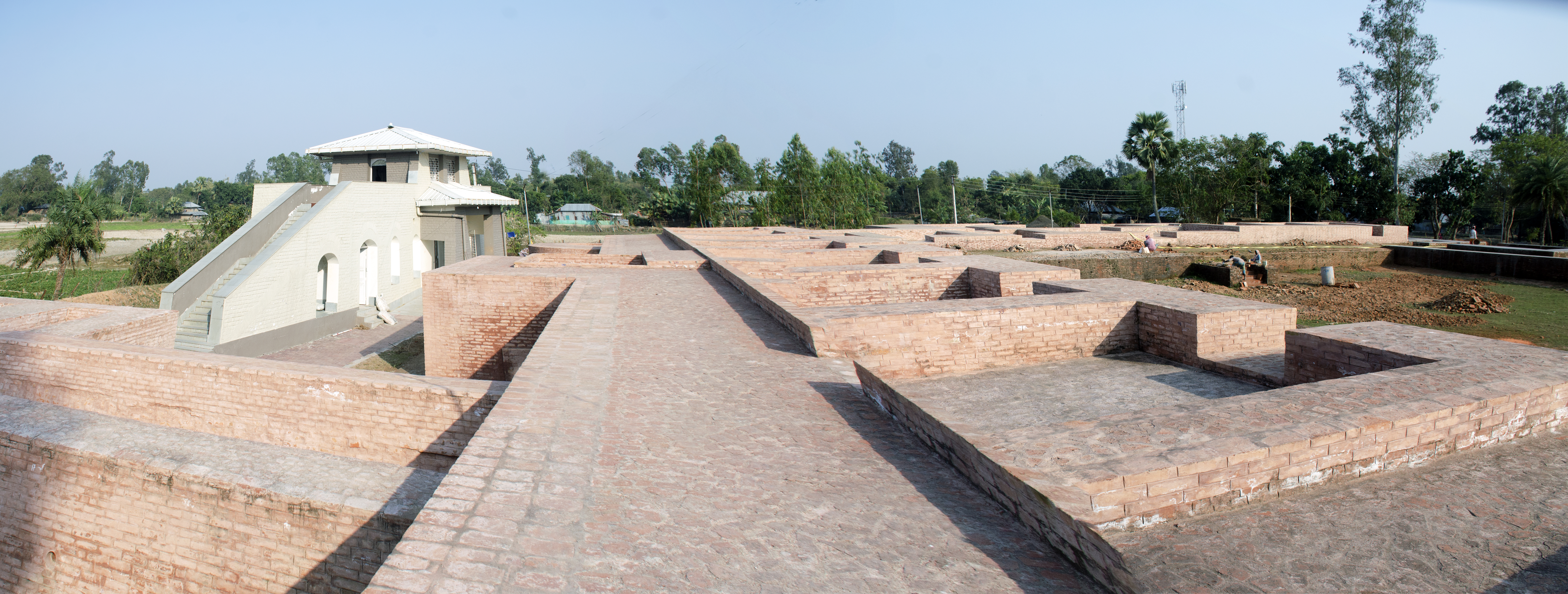
The renovated central structure of the Mahavihar and the view tower standing next to it.

The Mahavihara structure stands on a raised terrace within the compound. It consists of chambers and vedi with varandas encircling a square courtyard. The structure has only one entrance, which is on the east side. The chambers are unequal in size, measurements of the largest chamber—4 meters by 4.10 meters.

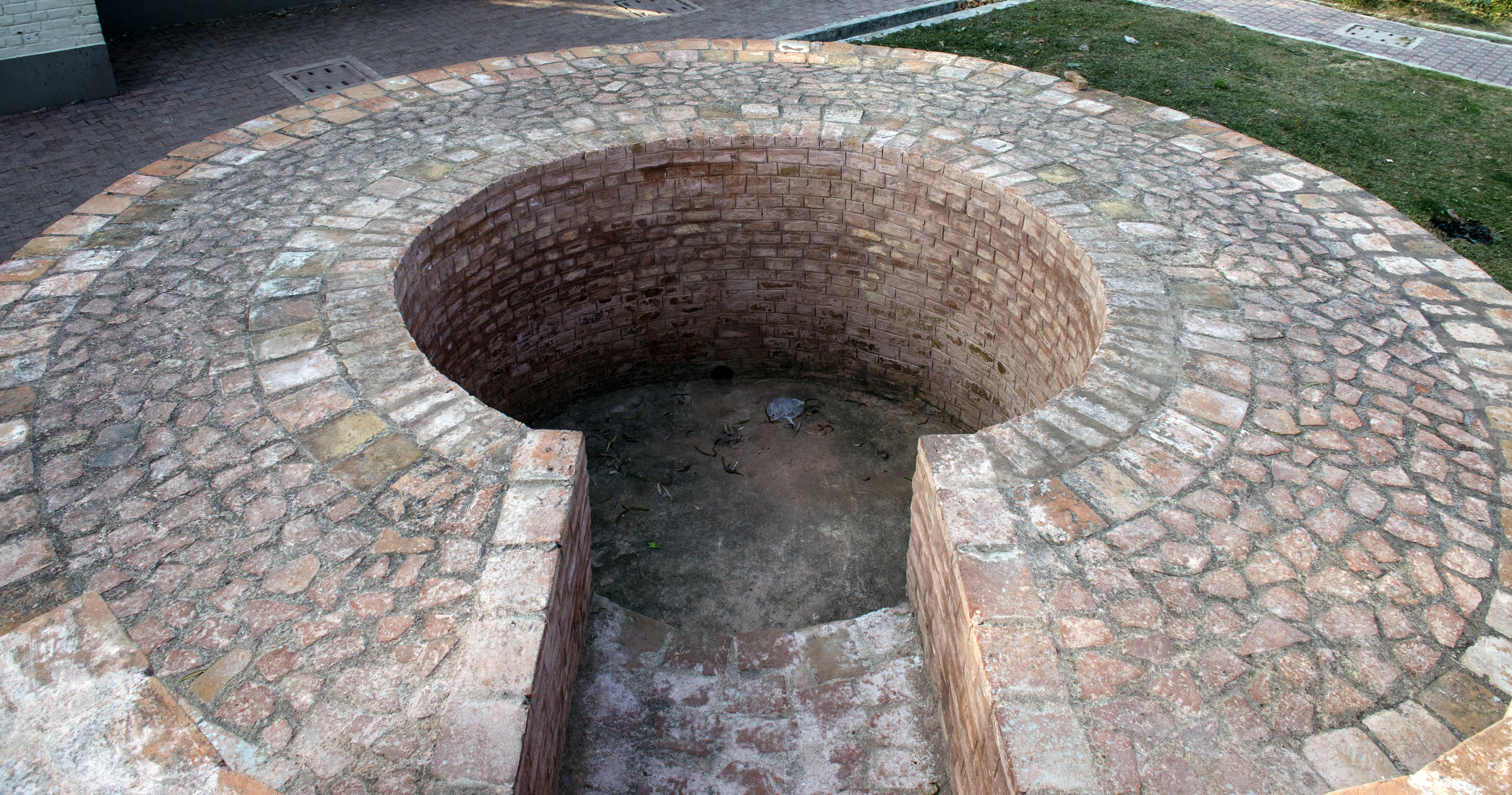
A circular bastion-cum-cell or tower chamber, located at the outer corner of the central structure.

The Mahavihara structure is almost square, and consists of a tower chamber at each corner of the exterior and a square courtyard inside. The courtyard was surrounded by paths adjacent to the varanda, which was constructed of tiles. At the north-east corner of the courtyard is a circular structure, which is assumed by researchers to be a well. There are two staircases on the eastern and western sides of the courtyard, the staircase on the western side being larger in size. The Veranda of Vihāra was 3 meters wide.

The main entrance faces the east, and the mahavihara has the vedi (altar) on the west. The entrance begins as a staircase on the outside, and is connected on the inside by two porchs—the front porch and the back porch. The porchs measure—10.20 meters in North-South and 3.50 meters in East-West. The front porch and the back porch were connected to each other by a 2 meter wide door.

== Bibliography ==
- Ghosh, Pradyot (1997). "সংযোজন - জগজ্জীবনপুর". মালদহ জেলার পুরাকীর্তি (Paperback) (in Bengali) (1st ed.). Kolkata: Directorate Of Archaeology And Museums, Information and Cultural Affairs Department, Government of West Bengal. pp. 129–137.
- Bhattacharya, Ashok; Santra, Tarapada; Majumdar, Hemen; Mukhopadhyay, Sameer kumar; Bose, Debashis; Chowdhury, Indrajit; Mitra, Sumedh; Sengupta, Gautam, eds. (2017). "পুরাবৃত্ত ১". Purabritta (in Bengali). Kolkata: Directorate Of Archaeology And Museums, Information and Cultural Affairs Department, Government of West Bengal: 145–160.
- Amar, Abhishek Singh (2009). "Contextualising the Navel of the Earth: The Emergence, Sustenance and Religious Transformation of Buddhism in the Bodhgaya Region (Circa. 300 BCE - 1200 CE)" (PDF).
