= Dharapat =

- Village
- Location in West Bengal, India Dharapat (India)
- Coordinates: 23.137388°N 87.299252°E
- Country: India
- State: West Bengal
- District: Bankura

Government
  - Body: Gram panchayat

Population (2011)
  - Total: 1,399

Languages
  - Official: Bengali, English
- Time zone: UTC+5:30 (IST)
- ISO 3166 code: IN-WB
- Vehicle registration: WB
- Lok Sabha constituency: Bishnupur
- Vidhan Sabha constituency: Bishnupur
- Website: bankura.gov.in

Dharapat is a village in Bishnupur subdivision of Bankura district in the Indian state of West Bengal. It is 12 kilometres (7.5 mi) north of Bishnupur.

== Geography ==
Places in Bishnupur subdivision in Bankura district
M: Municipal town, CT: census town, R: rural/ urban centre, T: ancient/ temple centre
Owing to space constraints in the small map, the actual locations in a larger map may vary slightly

=== Location ===
Dharapat is located at 23.137388°N 87.299252°E.

Note: The map alongside presents some of the notable locations in the subdivision. All places marked in the map are linked in the larger full screen map.

== Demographics ==
As per 2011 Census of India Dharapati had a total population of 1,399 of which 718 (51%) were males and 681 (49%) were females. Population below 6 years was 168. The total number of literates in Dharapati was 772 (62.71% of the population over 6 years).

== Education ==
Dharapat JB Primary School was established in 1960.

== Culture ==
Bankura district was once under the influence of Jainism and a number of Jain relics lie scattered in the district. Jain relics at villages Sonatapal, Bahulara, Dharapat, Harmasra and Paresnath (near Ambiknagar) are now taken as Hindu relics and some of the intact images are daily worshipped as Hindu deities. The temples at Dharapat and Bahulara villages have naked Jain images, which are known as "Nangta Thakur" or the naked deities. These deities are there along with Hindu deities.

According to a Bengali inscription in the main temple at Dharapat, it was built in 1694 or 1704. The idol is thought to be of Shyama Chand Thakur, commonly known as Nangta Thakur. The temple was built by Advesh, Raja of Dharapat. Barren women of the locality worship at the temple with the hope of bearing a child. The temple came up in place of a plastered laterite structure that had collapsed. The new temple has four small statues of flying lions on its four sides. There are three excellent stone idols in the temple — two Jain deities and Vishnu. All three are on the outer walls. There are a number of abandoned temples in the village. There are some stone relics in Dharapat. One of them, and a very interesting one, is a statue of Parasnath that has been converted into a Vishnu idol by carefully adding two hands. It obviously signifies the overpowering Hindu influence after the decline of Jainism in the area.

See also - Bengal temple architecture

== Dharapat picture gallery ==
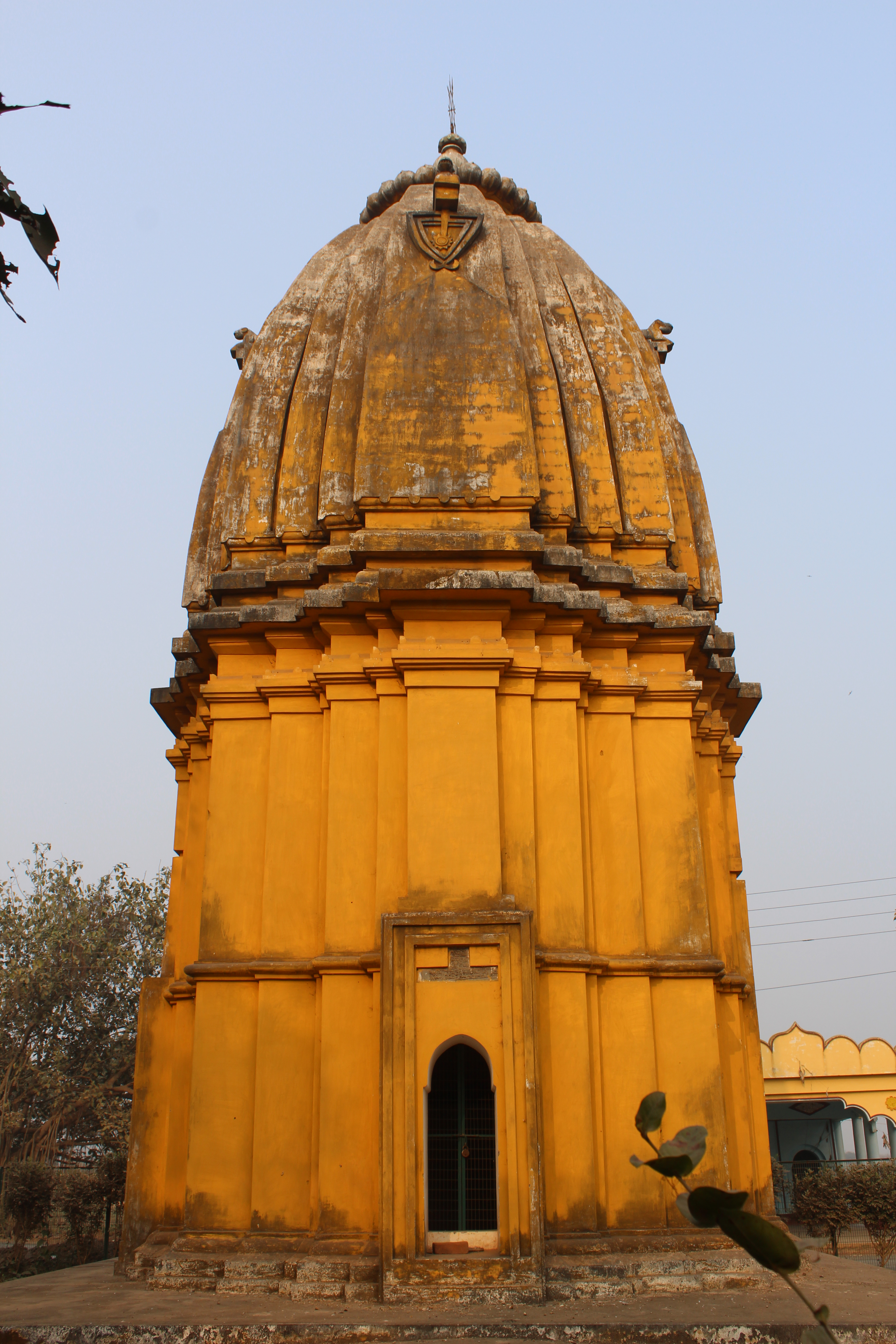
Deul of Dharapat

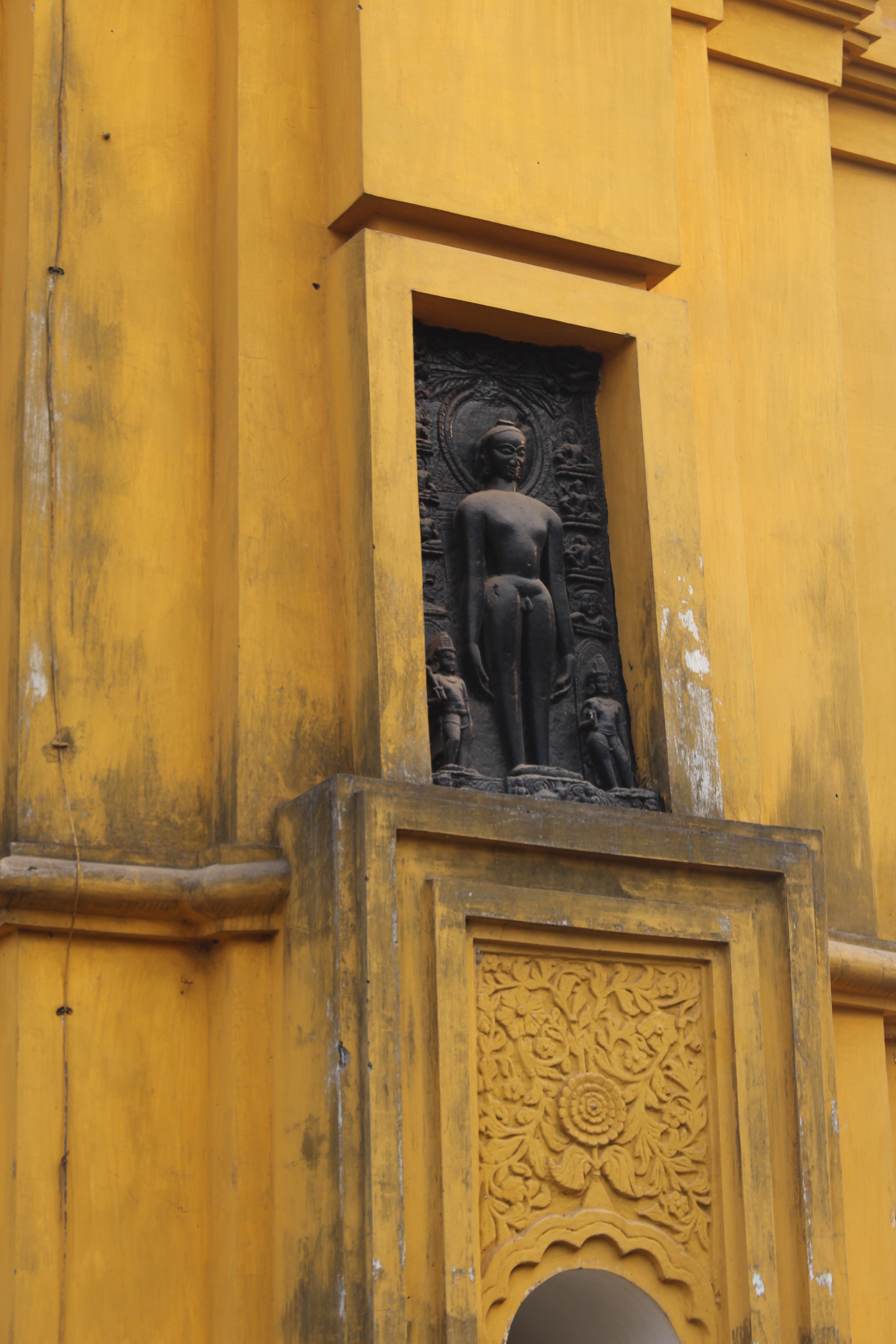
Statue of Jain Tirthankar on the wall

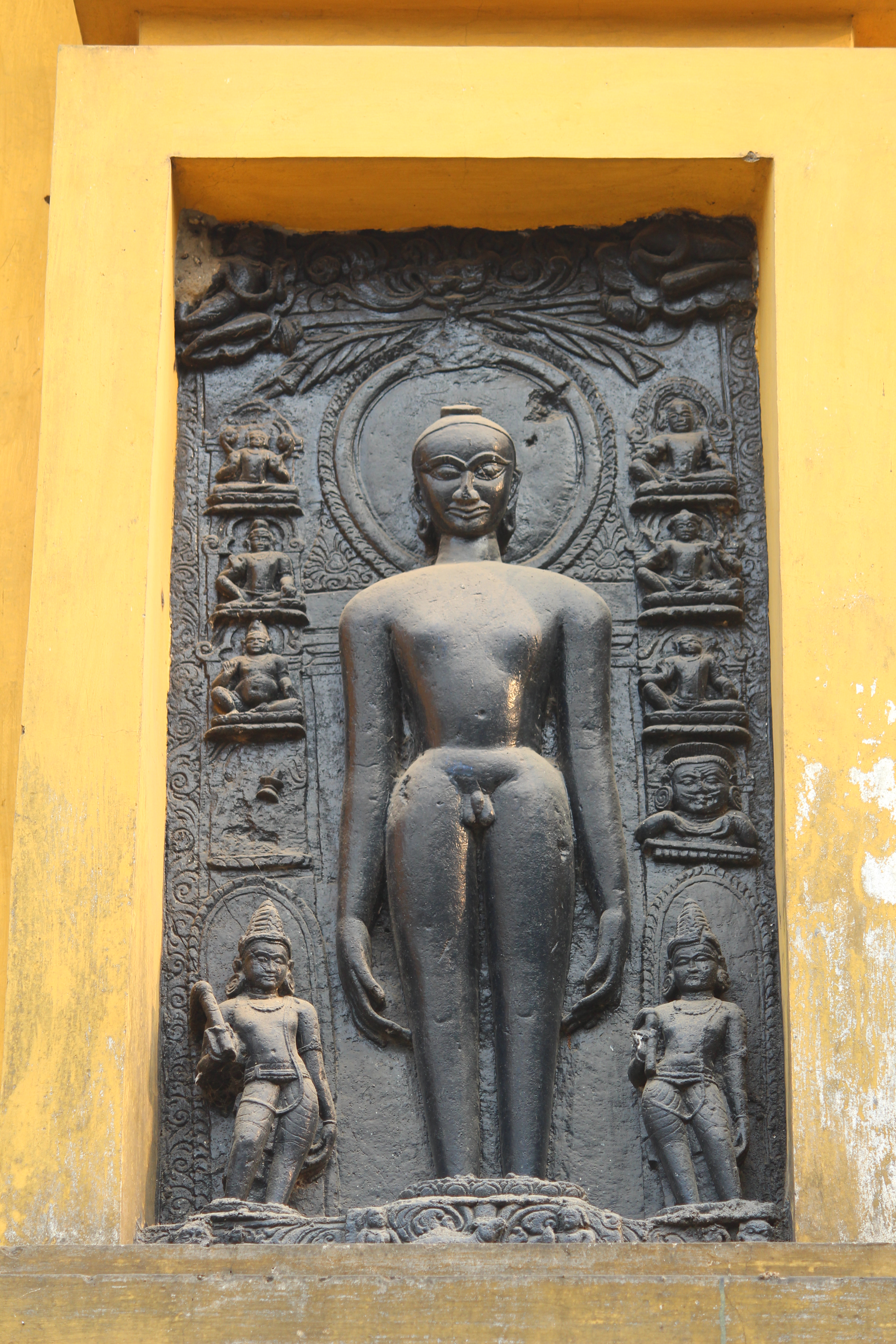
Statue of Jain Tirthankar on the wall

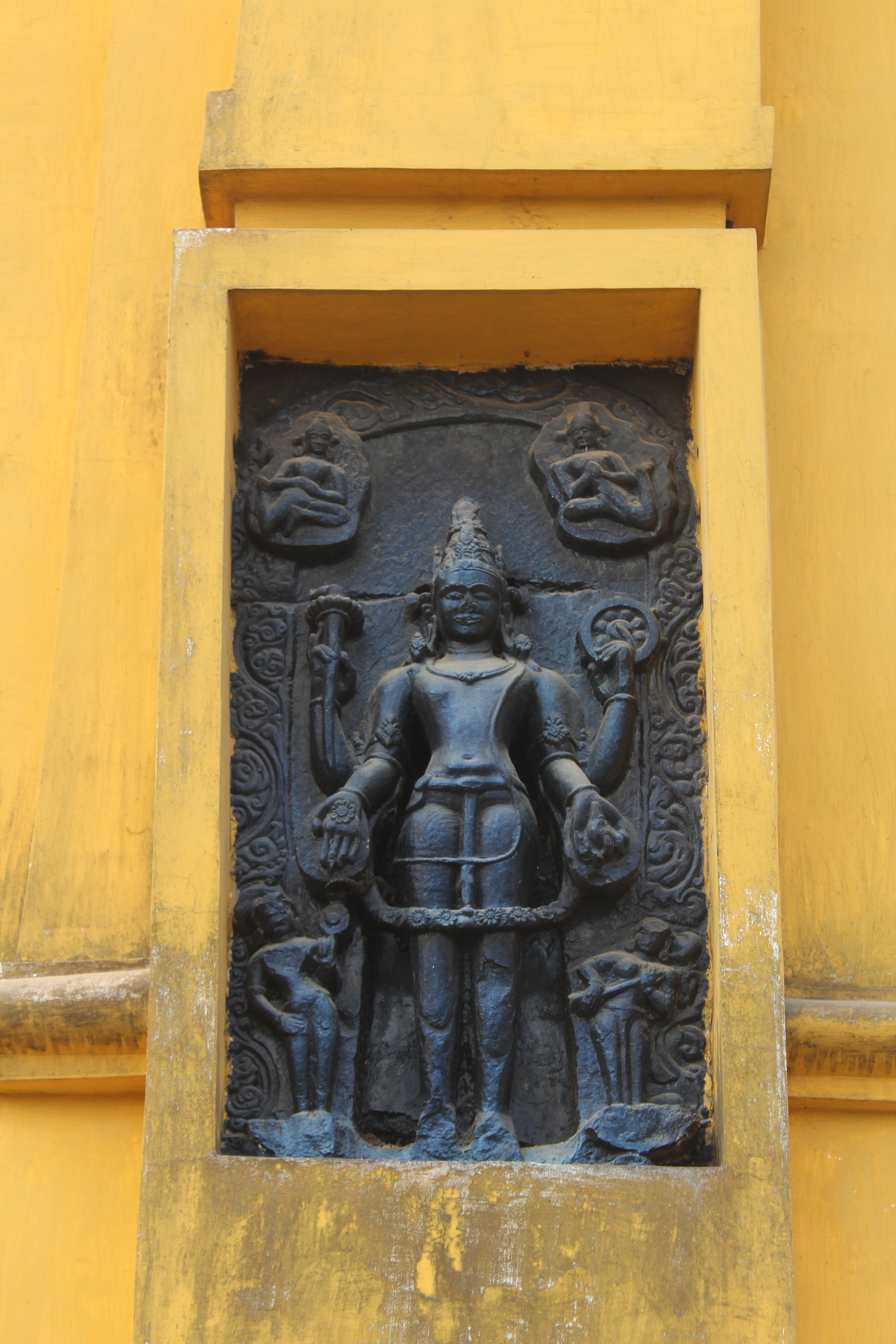
Statue of Vishnu on the wall

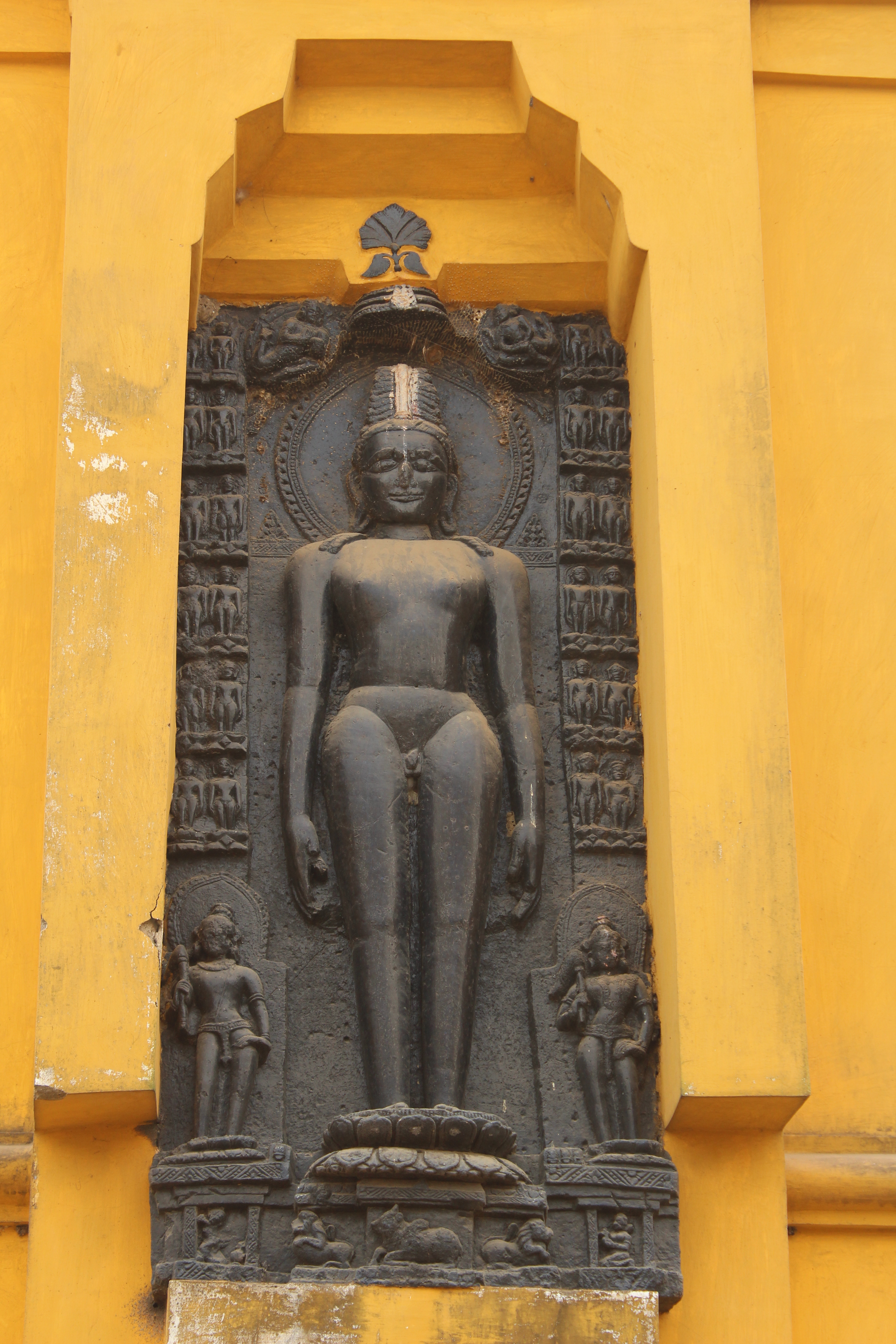
Statue of Jain Tirthankar on the wall

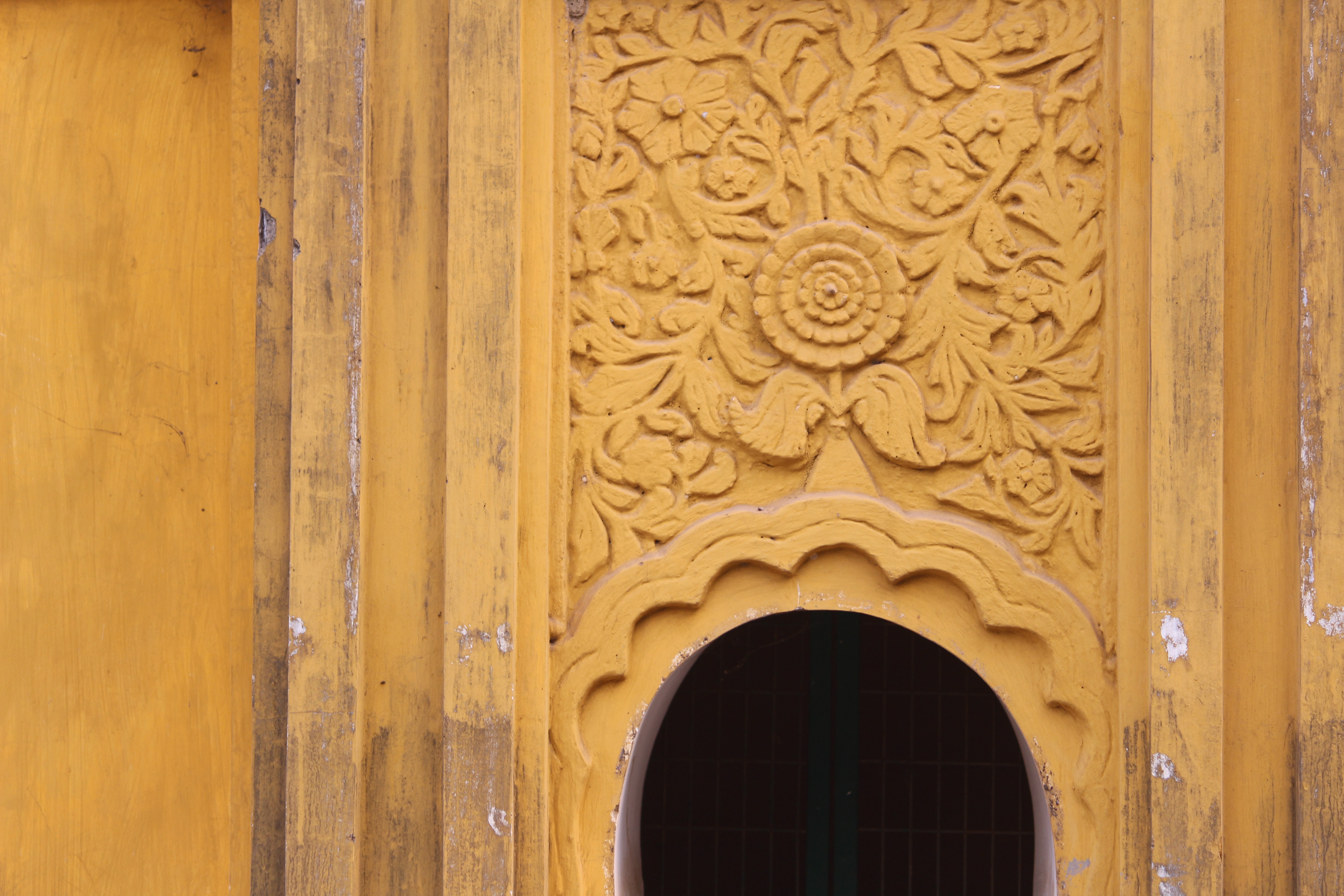
Floral relief

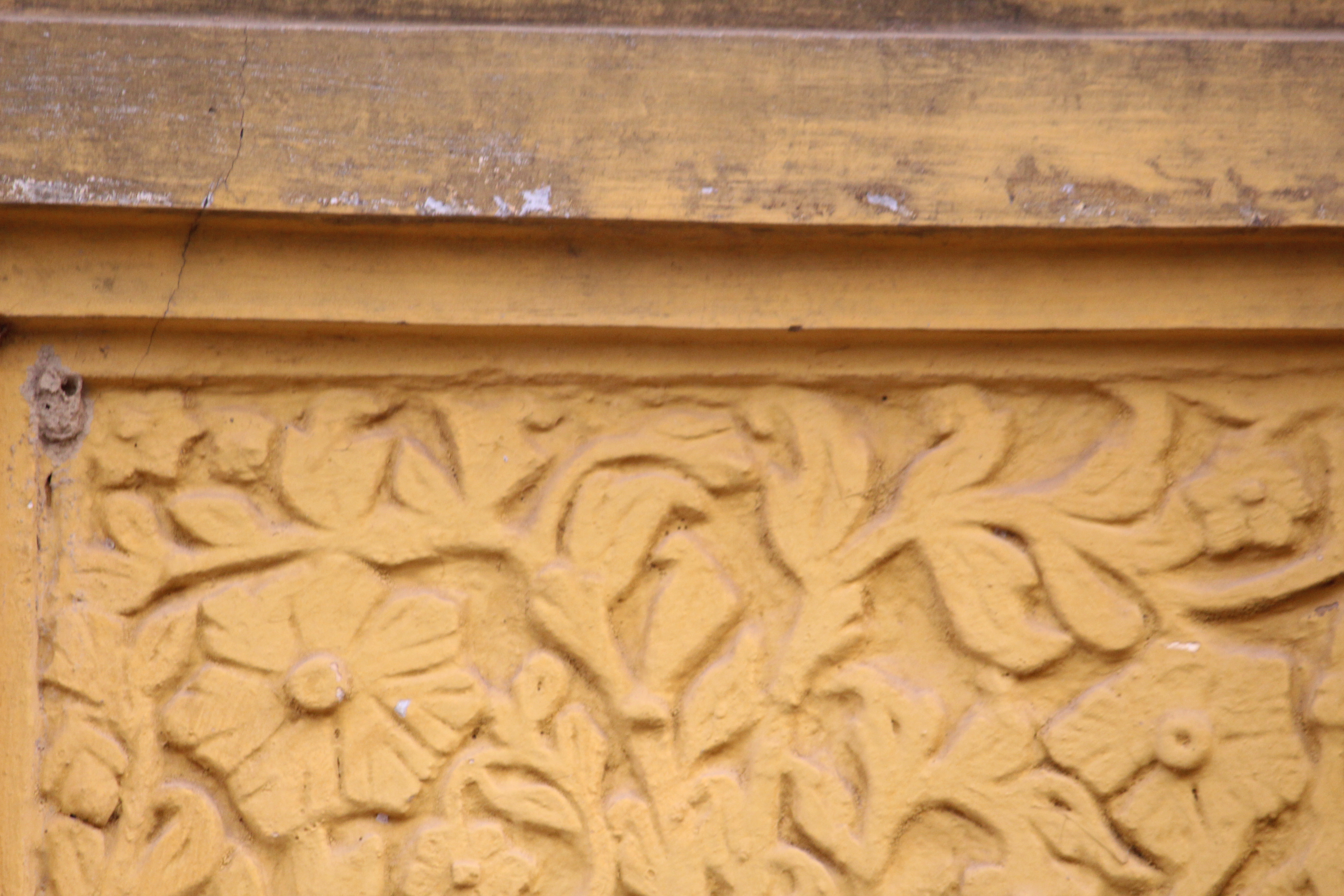
Floral relief

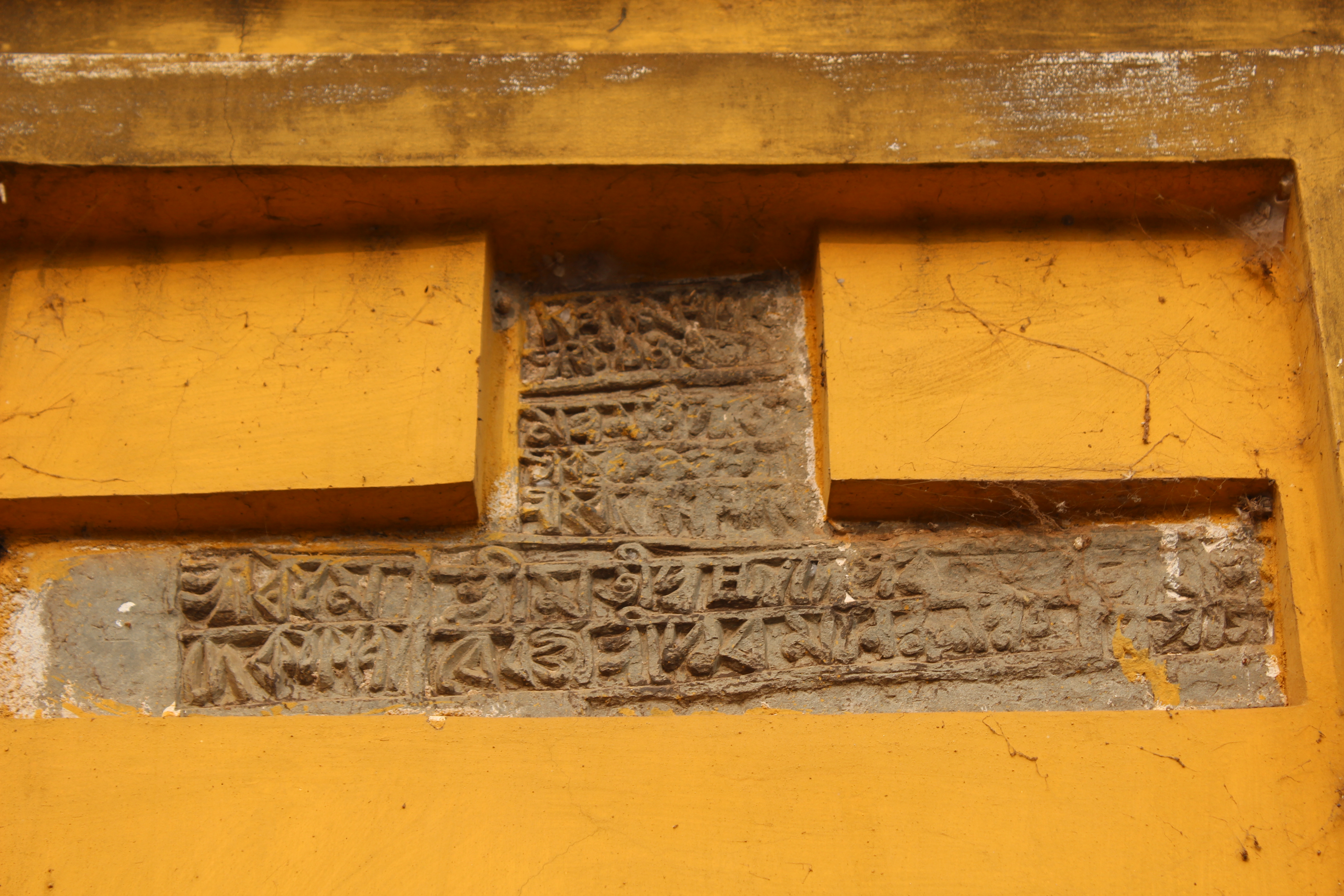
Floral relief

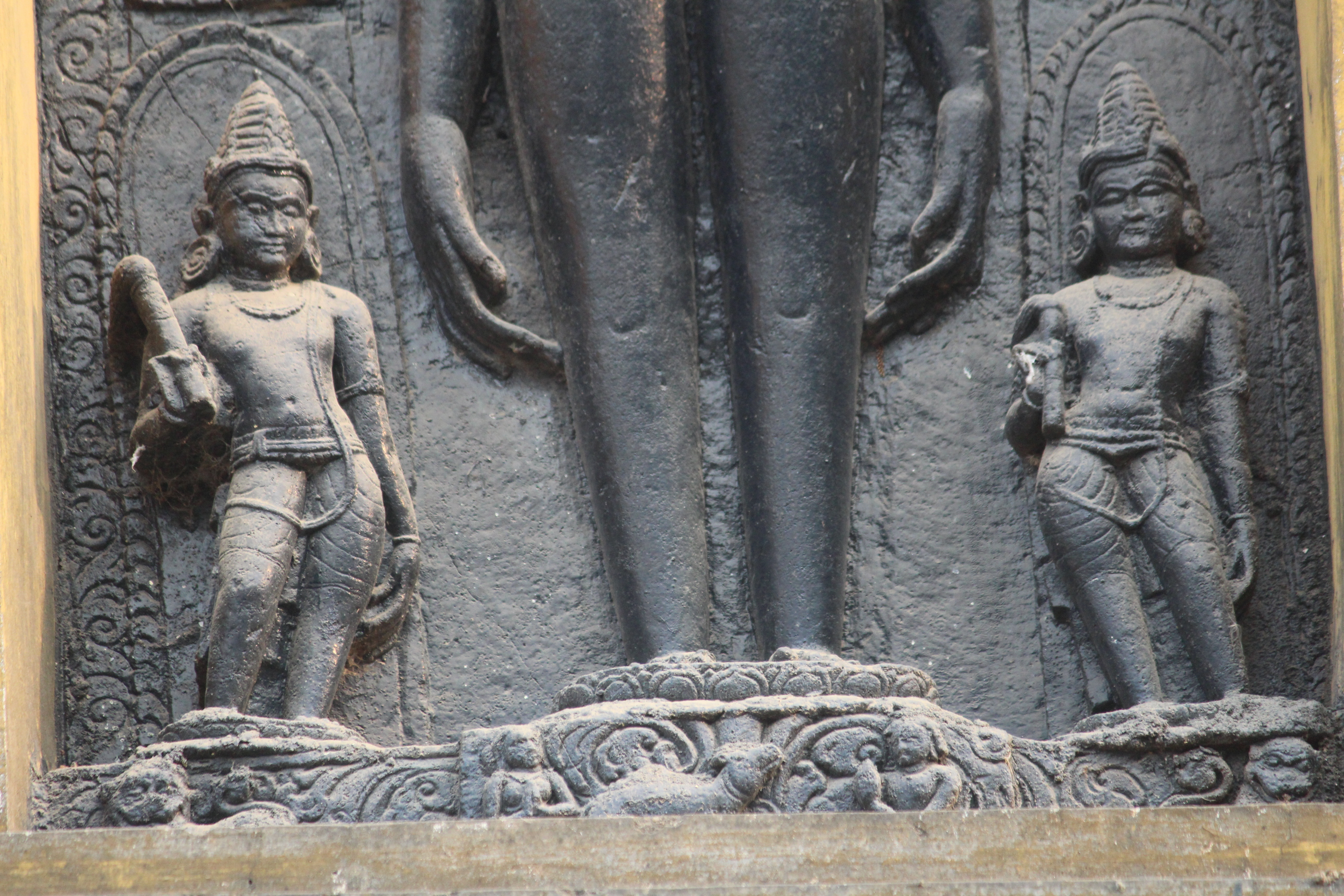
Closer view of the bottom
