= Sonatapal =

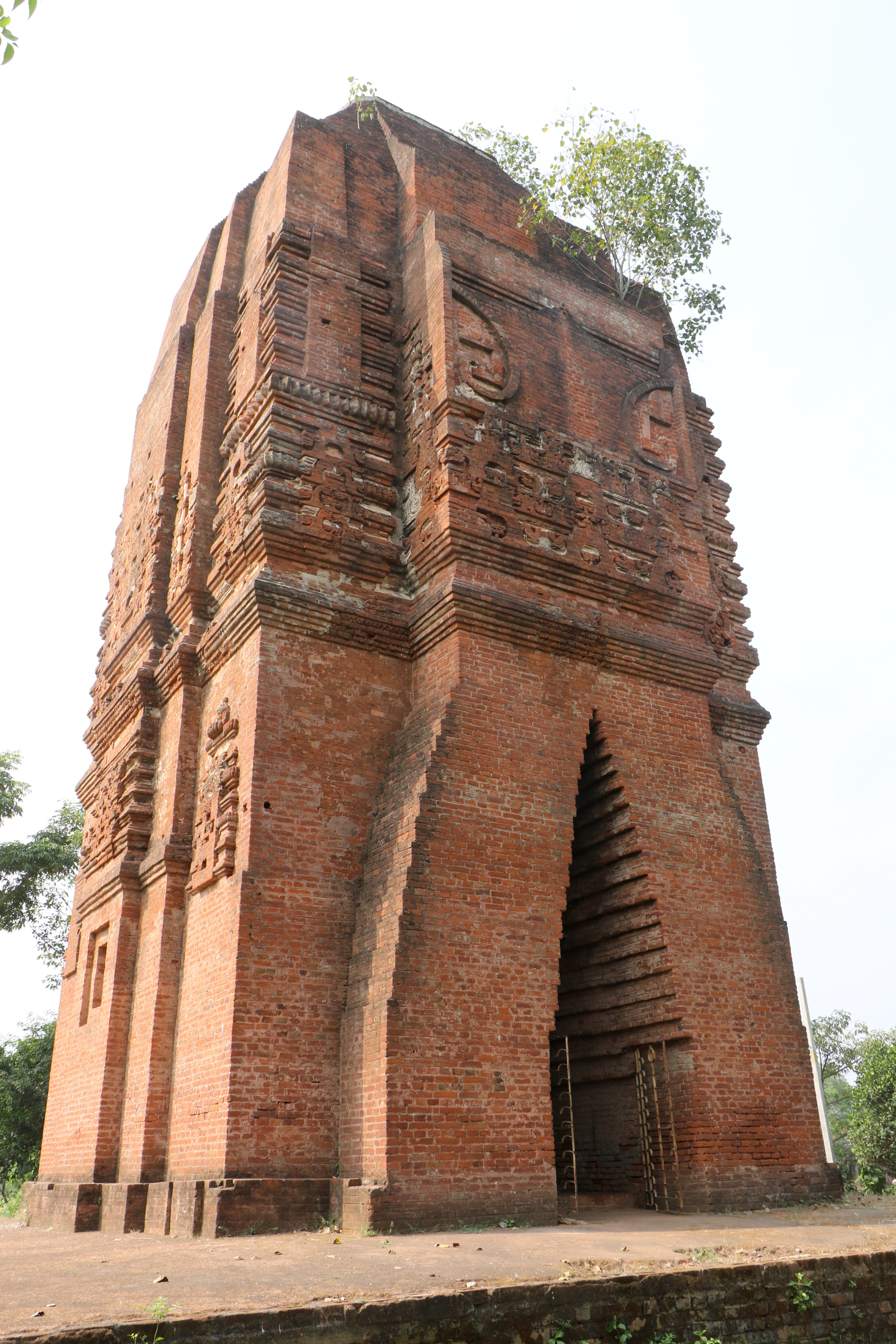
- Sun temple at Sonatapal

- Location in West Bengal Sonatapal (India)
- Coordinates: 23.2146800°N 87.1228600°E
- Country: India
- State: West Bengal
- District: Bankura
- Time zone: UTC+5:30 (IST)

Sonatapal is located 3.2 kilometres (2.0 mi) north-east of Ekteswar, near Bankura town, on the banks of Dwarakeswar River in Bankura district in the Indian state of West Bengal.

== Geography ==
Places in Bankura Sadar subdivision in Bankura district
M: municipal town/ city, CT: census town, R: rural/ urban centre, H: hill centre, T: temple, B: barrage
Owing to space constraints in the small map, the actual locations in a larger map may vary slightly

=== Location ===
Sonatapal is located at 23.2146800°N 87.1228600°E

Note: The map alongside presents some of the notable locations in the subdivision. All places marked in the map are linked in the larger full screen map.

== History ==
Sonatapal contains a large temple ascribed to the Rajas of Bishnupur. It is a remarkably solid and tall temple made of brick. Close to the temple, and on the low ground, which is under water during floods, are several mounds. The mounds, as well as the temple, are ascribed to Salibahan. The mounds near the river are said to be part of his garh (fort). The old name of the place is said by some to have been Hamirdanga.

Bankura district was once under the influence of Jainism and a number of Jain relics lie scattered in the district. Jain relics at villages Sonatapal, Bahulara, Dharapat, Harmasrah and Paresnath (near Ambiknagar) are now taken as Hindu relics and some of the intact images are daily worshipped as Hindu deities.

== Rekha deul ==
David J. McCutchion says that the pre-dominant traditional architectural style for temples in the western areas of Bengal in the pre-Muslim period is the tall curvilinear rekha deul and it went on developing from the late 7th century or early 8th century to around the 12th century, increasing its complexity and height but retaining its basic features. Such temples had “curvilinear shikhara with chaitya mesh decoration, surmounted by a large amalaka and kalasa finial. Examples of such dilapidated deulas are still standing at Satdeula (in Bardhaman), Bahulara and Sonatapal (in Bankura) and Deulghat (in Purulia). On the brick deulas already mentioned here, plus Jatar (in 24 Parganas) and Para (in Purulia), “we find extensive and remarkably fine stucco work on carved brick”.

=== Sonatapal picture gallery ===
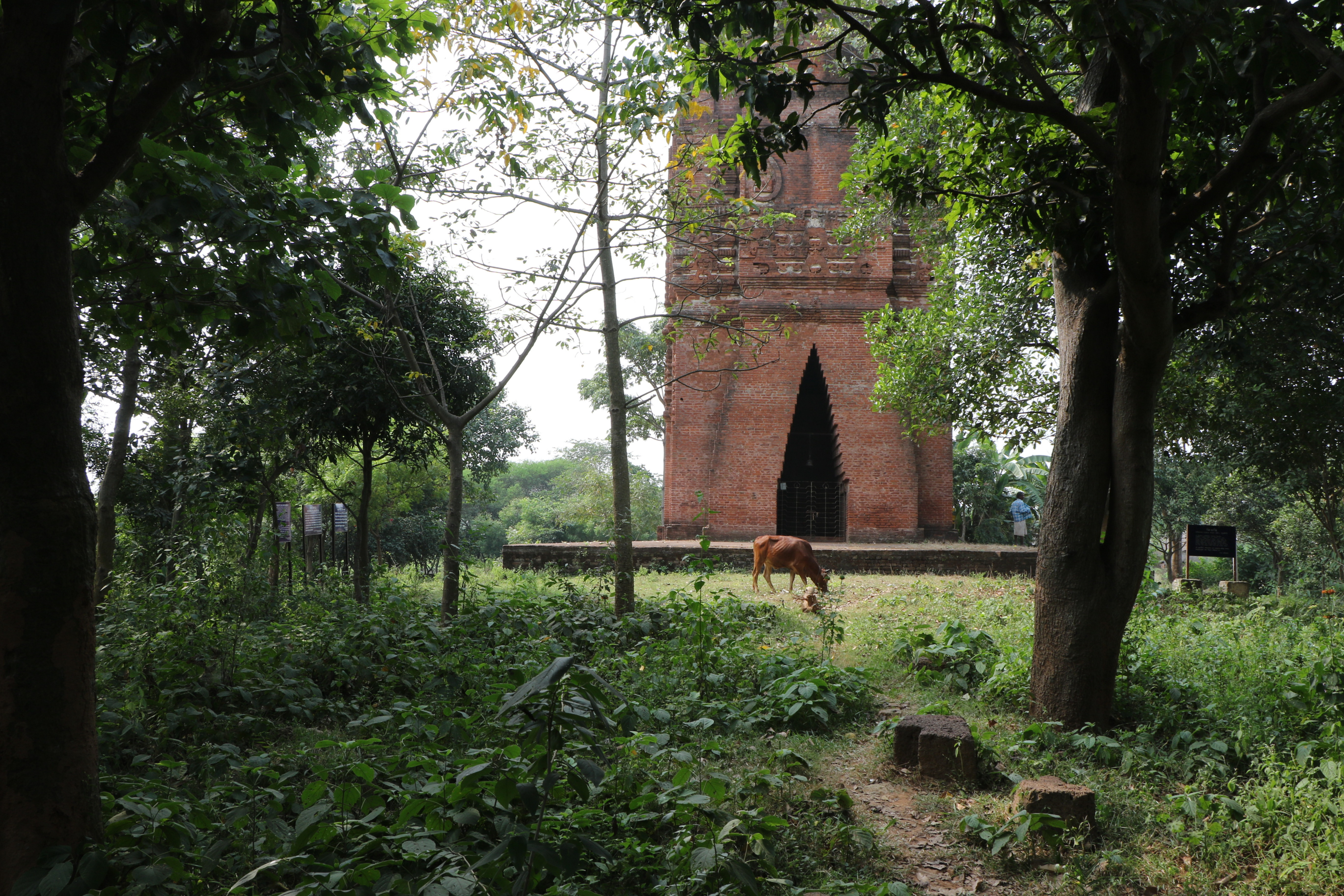
Sun temple

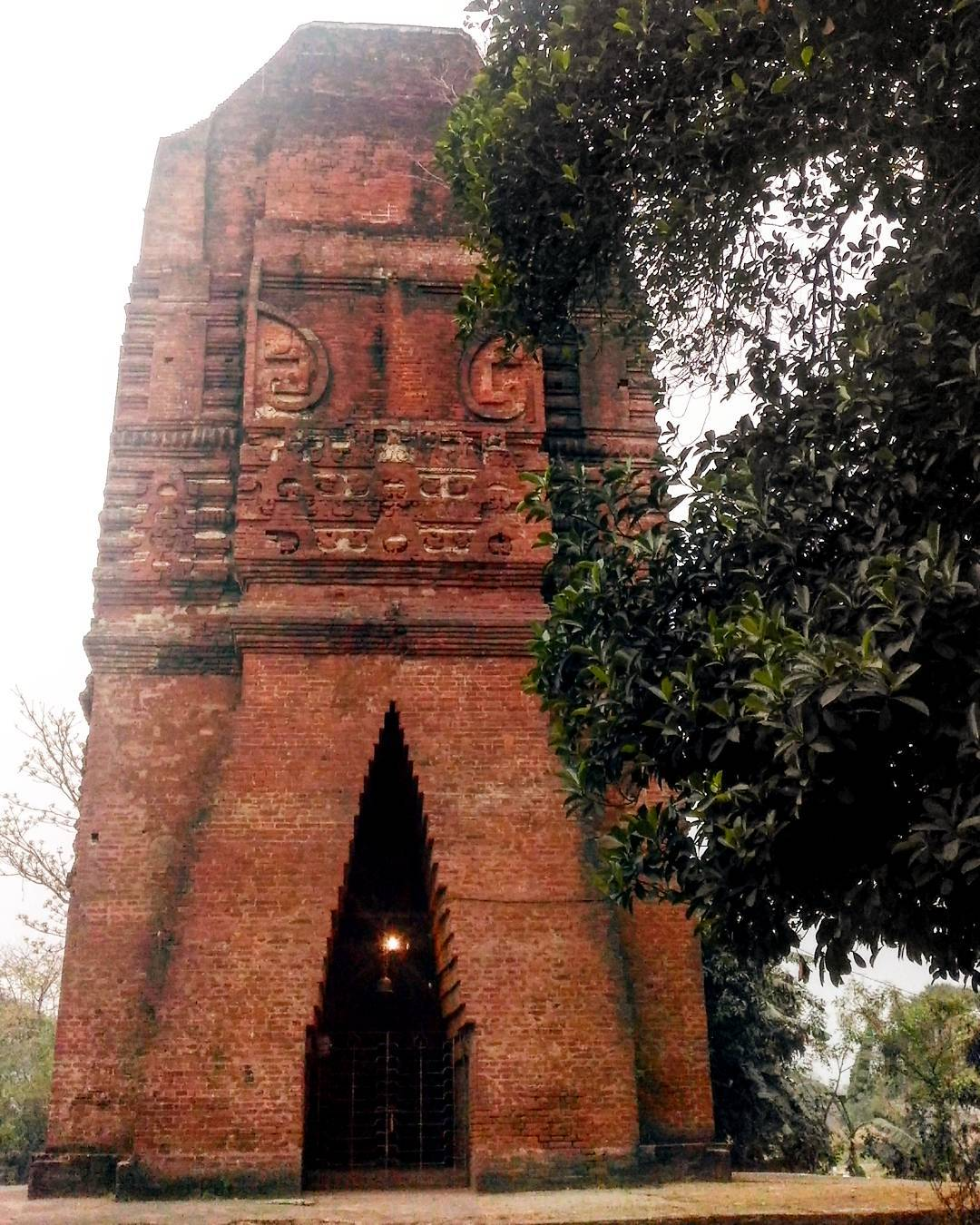
Sun temple

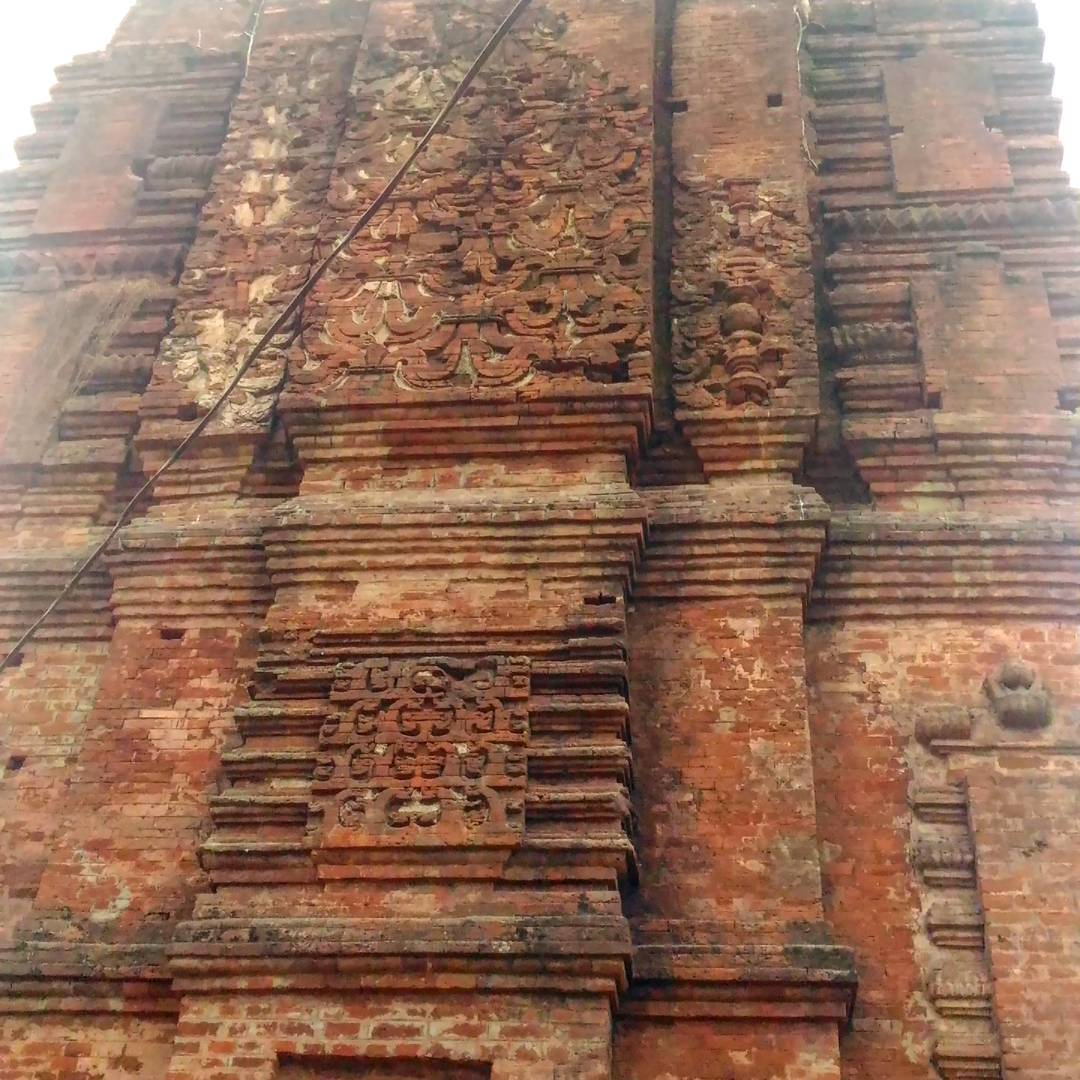
Sun temple
