= Harmasra =

Harmasra Harmara
- Village
- Location in West Bengal, India Harmasra (India)
- Coordinates: 23.024423°N 87.000117°E
- Country: India
- State: West Bengal
- District: Bankura

Population (2011)
  - Total: 3,131

Languages*
  - Official: Bengali, Santali, English
- Time zone: UTC+5:30 (IST)
- ISO 3166 code: IN-WB
- Vehicle registration: WB
- Lok Sabha constituency: Bankura
- Vidhan Sabha constituency: Taldangra
- Website: wb.gov.in

Harmasra is a gram panchayat under Taldangra intermediate panchayat, in Khatra subdivision of Bankura district in the Indian state of West Bengal.

== Geography ==
Places in Khatra subdivision in Bankura district
CT: census town, R: rural/ urban centre, C: craft centre, T: ancient/ temple centre
Owing to space constraints in the small map, the actual locations in a larger map may vary slightly

=== Location ===
Harmasra is located at 23°01′28″N 87°00′00″E PIN CODE- 722152

Note: The map alongside presents some of the notable locations in the subdivision. All places marked in the map are linked in the larger full screen map.

Census villages under Harmasra village panchayat are: Kadamara, Sulgi, Kiasol, Marasol, Harmasra, Keshetara, Bhimara, Chunalu, Dolbagicha, Jarkapaksara, Karanjabedia, Baghdoba, Ghagar, Patharkura, Tilabani, Kuldiha, Chakkuldiha, Sushunia, Mahishakanali, Bali Bandh, Nabagram, Maibandhi, Khichka, Rampur Kolsuli, Jamua.

There are some small but picturesque water falls along the course of the Shilabati near Harmasra,

== Demographics ==
According to the 2011 Census of India, Harmasra had a total population of 3,131 of which males were 1,581 (50%) and females were 1,550 (50%). Population in the age range 0–6 years was 341. The total number of literate persons in Harmasra was 2,044 (73.26% of the population over 6 years).

.*For language details see Taldangra (community development block)#Language and religion

== Transport ==
=== Railways ===
The nearest railway station to Harmasra is Bheduasol which is located in and around 23.4 kilometer distance. Bankura Railway Station is the most important among others. The following table shows other railway stations and its distance.

- Bheduasol railway station = 23.4 km.
- Bankura railway station = 23.5 km.
- Bishnupur railway station = 31.1 km.
- ShriRampuram railway station = 46.7 km.
- Kalipahari railway station = 47.1 km.

== Culture ==
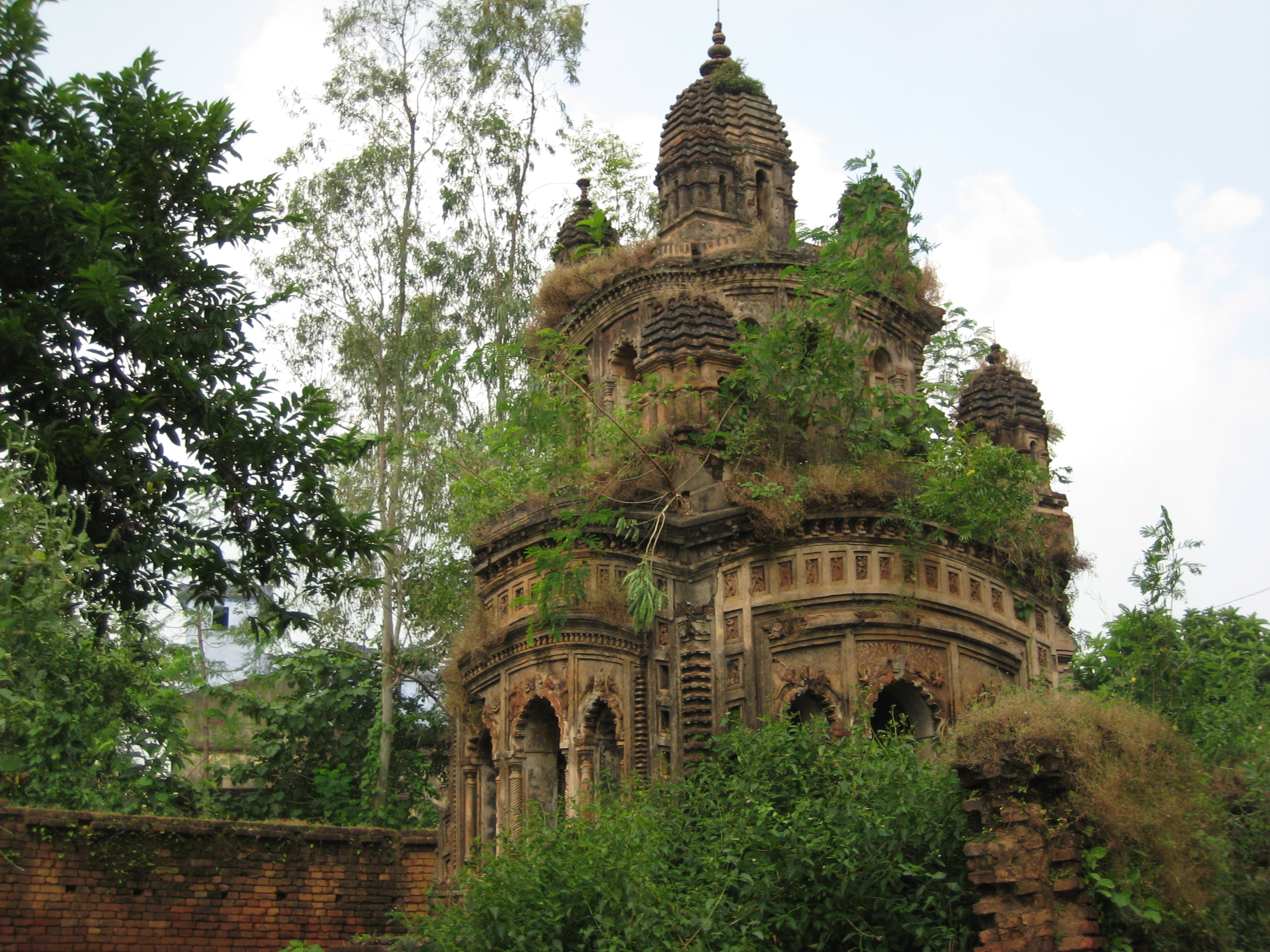
Rasmancha in Harmasra

Bankura district was once under the influence of Jainism and a number of Jain relics lie scattered in the district. Jain relics at villages Sonatapal, Bahulara, Dharapat, Harmasra and Pareshnath (near Ambiknagar) are now taken as Hindu relics and some of the intact images are daily worshipped as Hindu deities. Harmasra has Jain temple made up of bricks with a shikhara. The temple has an image of Parshavanatha along with small images of other tirthankars.

David J. McCutchion mentions the Lakshmi Janardana temple as a small flat roofed or chandni-type temple built in the 19th century having a base of 20’6” x 11’2”, with terracotta decoration. He describes the large square rasmancha as being like a pancha-ratna, with both or either upper and lower cornices curved. He describes the square rasmancha of the Ray family as having temple-type nava-ratna turrets. Built in the 19th century with laterite and brick, and having a base of 14’ square, it has terracotta decorations and plaster work.

== Education ==
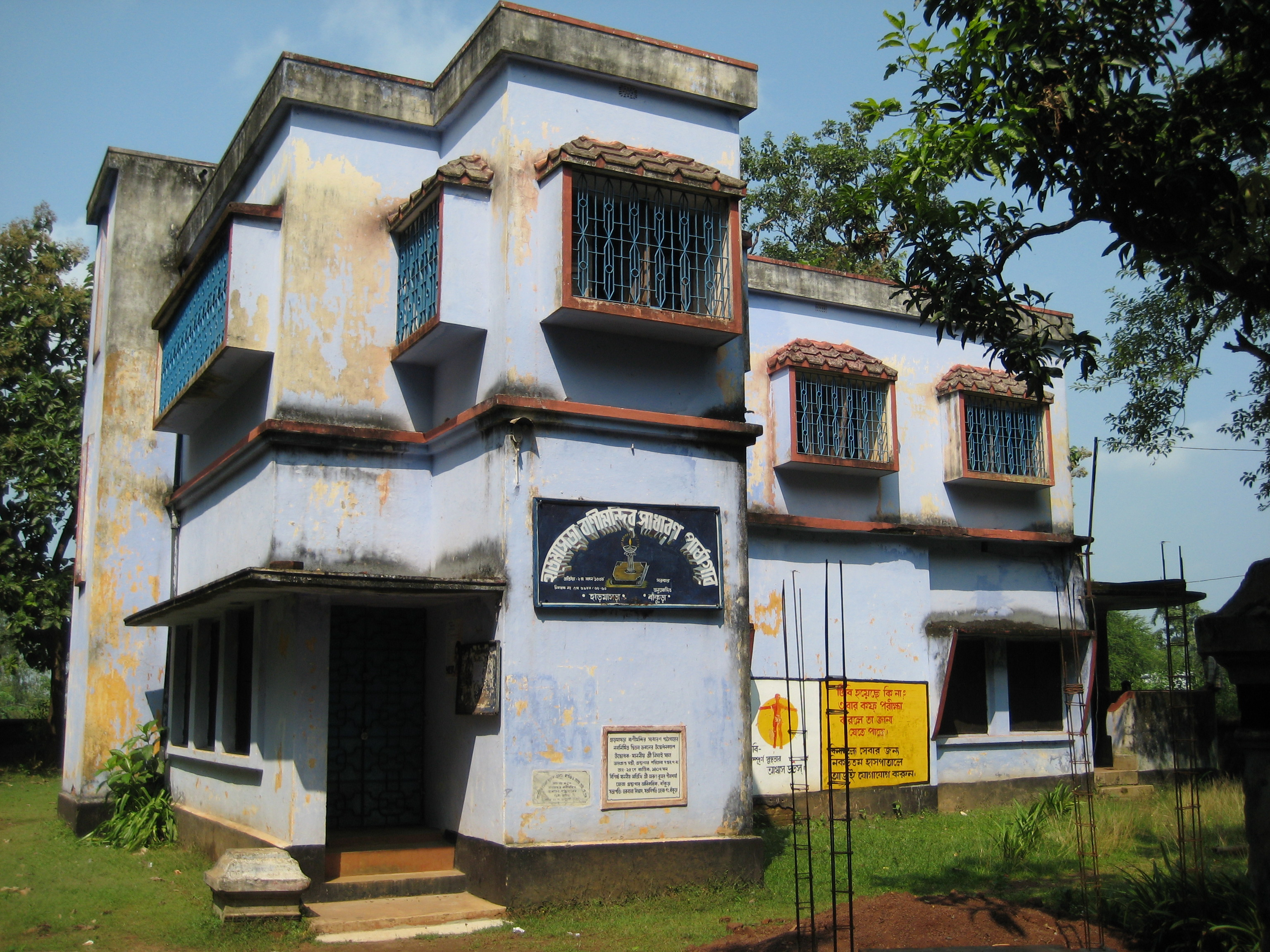
Harmasra Library

Harmasra High School, is a Bengali-medium coeducational institution established in 1921. It has facilities for teaching from class V to class XII. The school has 26 computers, a library with 500 books and a playground.

Kadma High School, is a Bengali-medium coeducational institution established in 1951. It has facilities for teaching from class V to class X. The school has a library with 100 books and a playground.

Harmasra Girls Junior High School, is a Bengali-medium girls only institution established in 1959. It has facilities for teaching from class V to class X. The school has 10 computers, a library with 430 books and a playground.

== Gallery ==
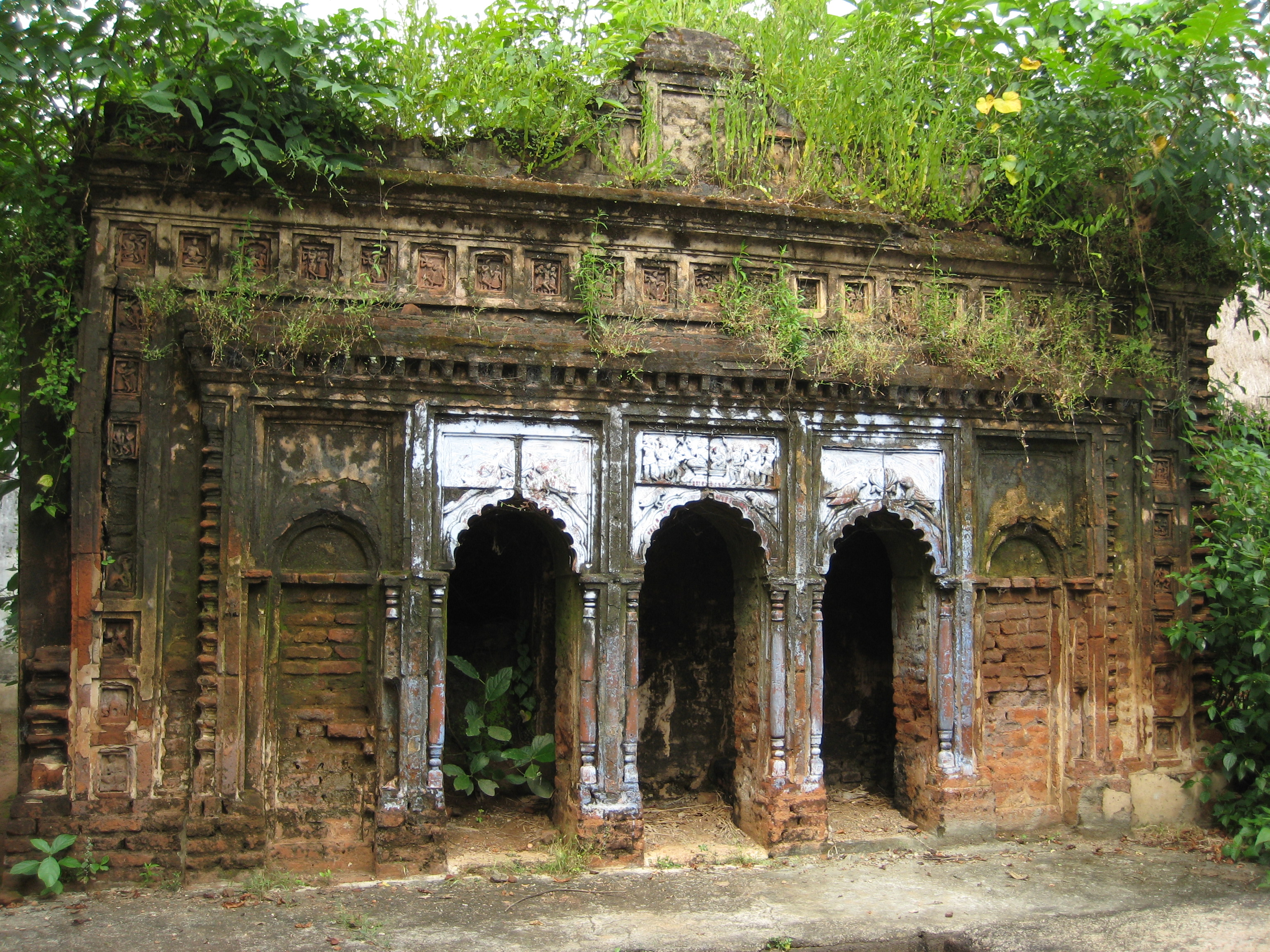
An Old Temple

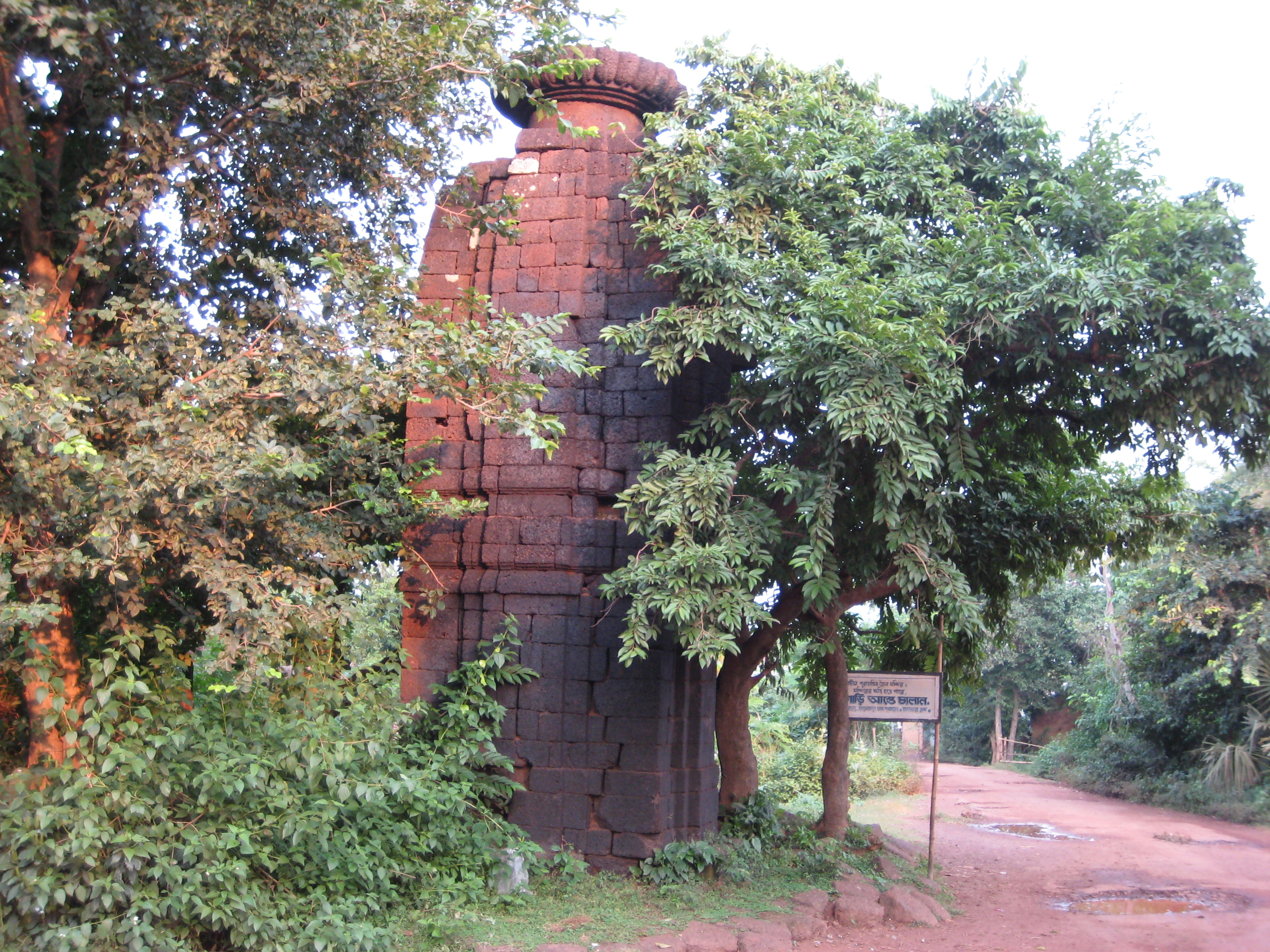
Jain Temple

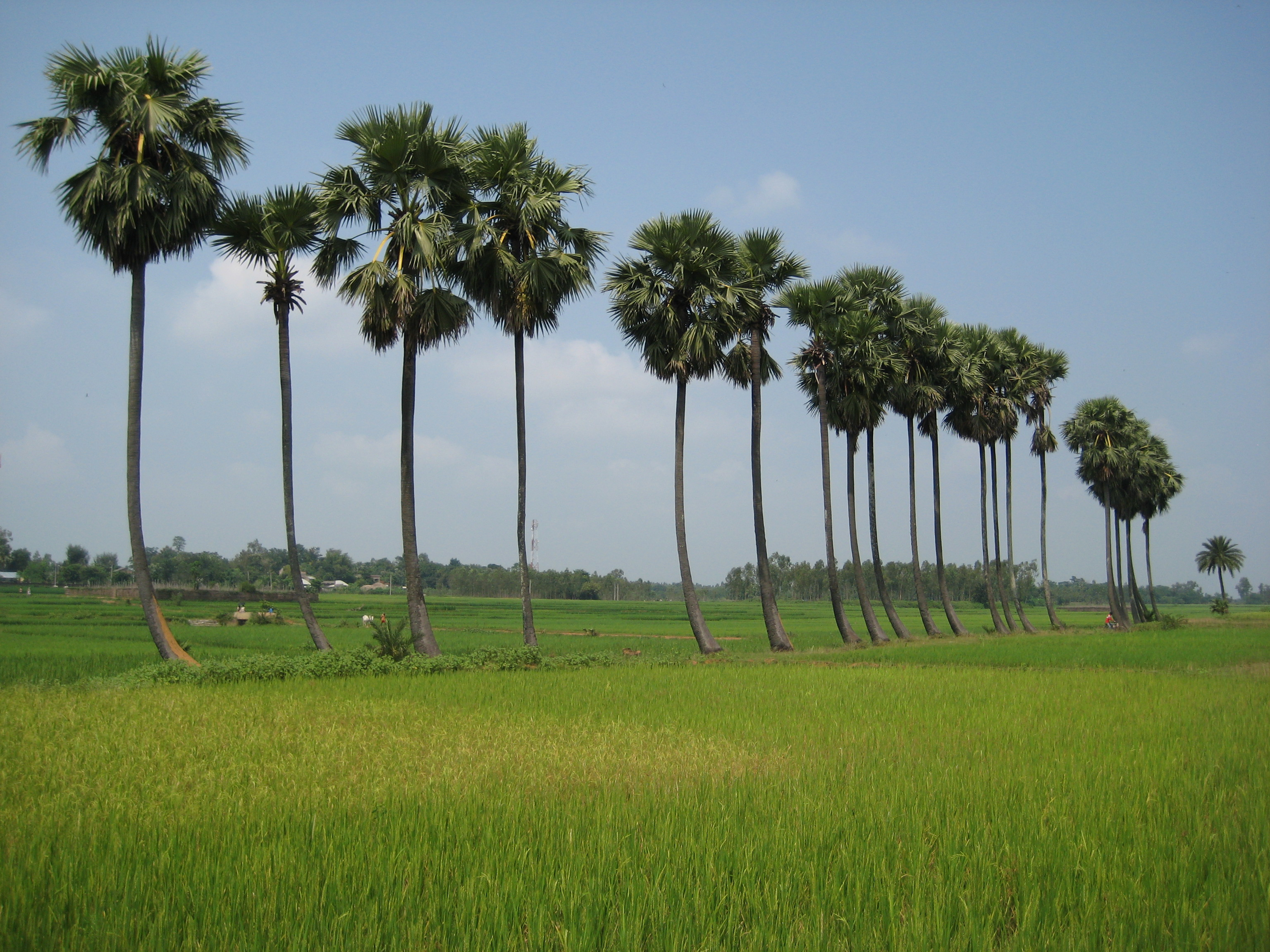
Near Harmasra School

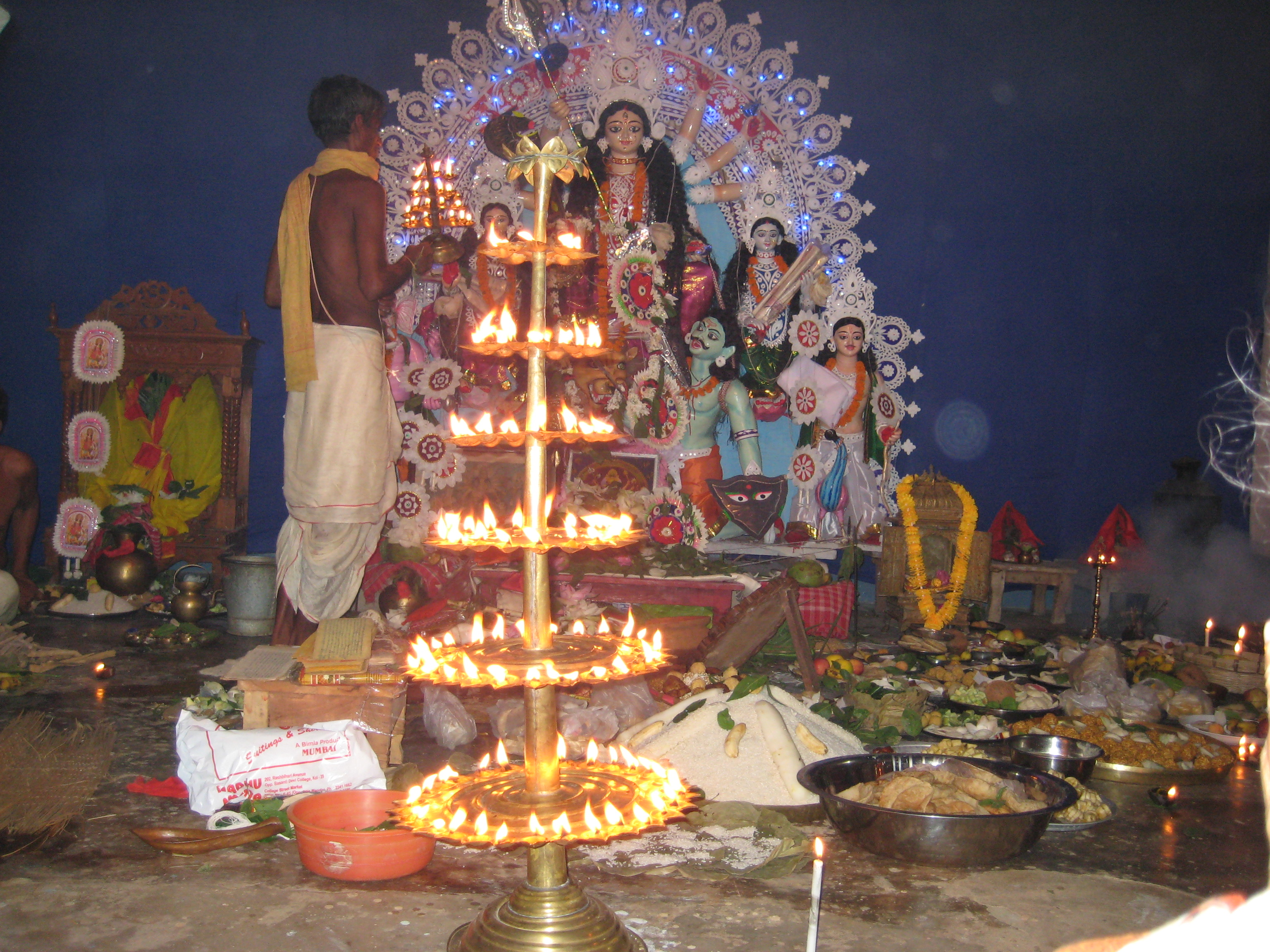
Harmasra Durga Puja
