= Pareshnath =

- Village
- Location in West Bengal, India Pareshnath (India)
- Coordinates: 22.955921°N 86.747607°E
- Country: India
- State: West Bengal
- District: Bankura

Population (2011)
  - Total: 219

Languages
  - Official: Bengali, Santali, English
- Time zone: UTC+5:30 (IST)
- PIN: 722148
- Telephone/STD code: 03243
- Lok Sabha constituency: Bankura
- Vidhan Sabha constituency: Ranibandh
- Website: bankura.gov.in

Pareshnath is a village in the Ranibandh CD block in the Khatra subdivision of the Bankura district in the state of West Bengal, India.

== Geography ==
Places in Khatra subdivision in Bankura district
CT: census town, R: rural/ urban centre, C: craft centre, T: ancient/ temple centre
Owing to space constraints in the small map, the actual locations in a larger map may vary slightly

=== Location ===
Pareshnath is located at 22.955921°N 86.747607°E.

Note: The map alongside presents some of the notable locations in the subdivision. All places marked in the map are linked in the larger full screen map.

== Demographics ==
According to the 2011 Census of India, Pareshnath had a total population of 219, of which 119 (54%) were males and 100 (46%) were females. There were 189 persons in the age range of 0–6 years. The total number of literate persons in Pareshnath was 50 (26.46% of the population over 6 years).

== Culture ==
Bankura district was once under the influence of Jainism and a number of Jain relics lie scattered in the district. Jain relics at villages Sonatapal, Bahulara, Dharapat, Harmasra and Paresnath (near Ambikanagar) are now taken as Hindu relics and some of the intact images are daily worshipped as Hindu deities.

There are two ancient sites at Pareshnath (temple site now represented only by a mound and a statue of Surya and temple site of an old Jain temple now represented only by a mound with a Jain statue) and both the sites are included in the List of Monuments of National Importance in West Bengal by the Archaeological Survey of India (serial no. N-WB-34 & 35).
