= Ambikanagar, Bankura =

Ambikanagar
- Village
- Location in West Bengal, India Ambikanagar (India)
- Coordinates: 22.944921°N 86.770607°E
- Country: India
- State: West Bengal
- District: Bankura

Population (2011)
  - Total: 3,228

Languages
  - Official: Bengali, Santali, English
- Time zone: UTC+5:30 (IST)
- PIN: 722135
- Telephone/STD code: 03243
- Lok Sabha constituency: Bankura
- Vidhan Sabha constituency: Ranibandh
- Website: bankura.gov.in

Ambikanagar is a village and a gram panchayat in the Ranibandh CD block in the Khatra subdivision of the Bankura district in the state of West Bengal, India.

== History ==
According to Binoy Ghosh, around 800–900 years ago, several centres of Jainism developed at different points on the banks of the Kangsabati River, stretching across what are now the Purulia and Bankura districts. The entire area along the river from Purulia to Medinipur is inhabited predominantly by Adivasis and backward castes, and the Jains (mostly Digambar Jains) developed their settlements along the river valley. There was a large Jain cultural centre covering Ambikanagar, Chitgiri, Barakola, Pareshnath, Chiada, Kendua and other places. Much of the centre has obviously gone under the Kangsabati dam. Debala Mitra, of the Archaeological department, had published a description of the place in the journal of the Asiatic Society in 1958 and that remains the only historical document about this area. Debala Mitra had opined that Ambika was the protector-goddess (Shashan Devi) of Tirthankar Neminatha. Among the statues found at the place were those of Rishabhanatha, Parshvanatha, Neminatha and others. The village was named after the Jain goddess Ambika and it was later that Ambika came to be worshipped here as a Brahmanical goddess.

== Geography ==
Places in Khatra subdivision in Bankura district
CT: census town, R: rural/ urban centre, C: craft centre, T: ancient/ temple centre
Owing to space constraints in the small map, the actual locations in a larger map may vary slightly

=== Location ===
Ambikanagar is located at 22.944921°N 86.770607°E.

Note: The map alongside presents some of the notable locations in the subdivision. All places marked in the map are linked in the larger full screen map.

== Demographics ==
According to the 2011 Census of India, Ambikanagar had a total population of 3,228, of which 1,674 (52%) were males and 1,554 (48%) were females. There were 347 persons in the age range of 0–6 years. The total number of literate persons in Ambikanagar was 2,171 (75.36% of the population over 6 years).

== Education ==
Ambikanagar Higher Secondary School is a Bengali-medium coeducational institution established in 1953. It has facilities for teaching from class V to class XII. It has a library with 2,020 books and a playground.

Dabri SSB Higher Secondary School is a Bengali-medium coeducational institution established in 1968. It has facilities for teaching from class V to class XII. The school has a library with 465 books and a playground.

== Culture ==
David J. McCutchion says that in the remote areas of old Manbhum district the Jains went on building temples till the 13th century, and many of them are still standing at Bahulara, Harmasra, Deulbhirya, Ambikanagar, Chharra, Pakbirra, Tuisama or Deoli, in Bankura and Purulia districts.

== Gallery ==
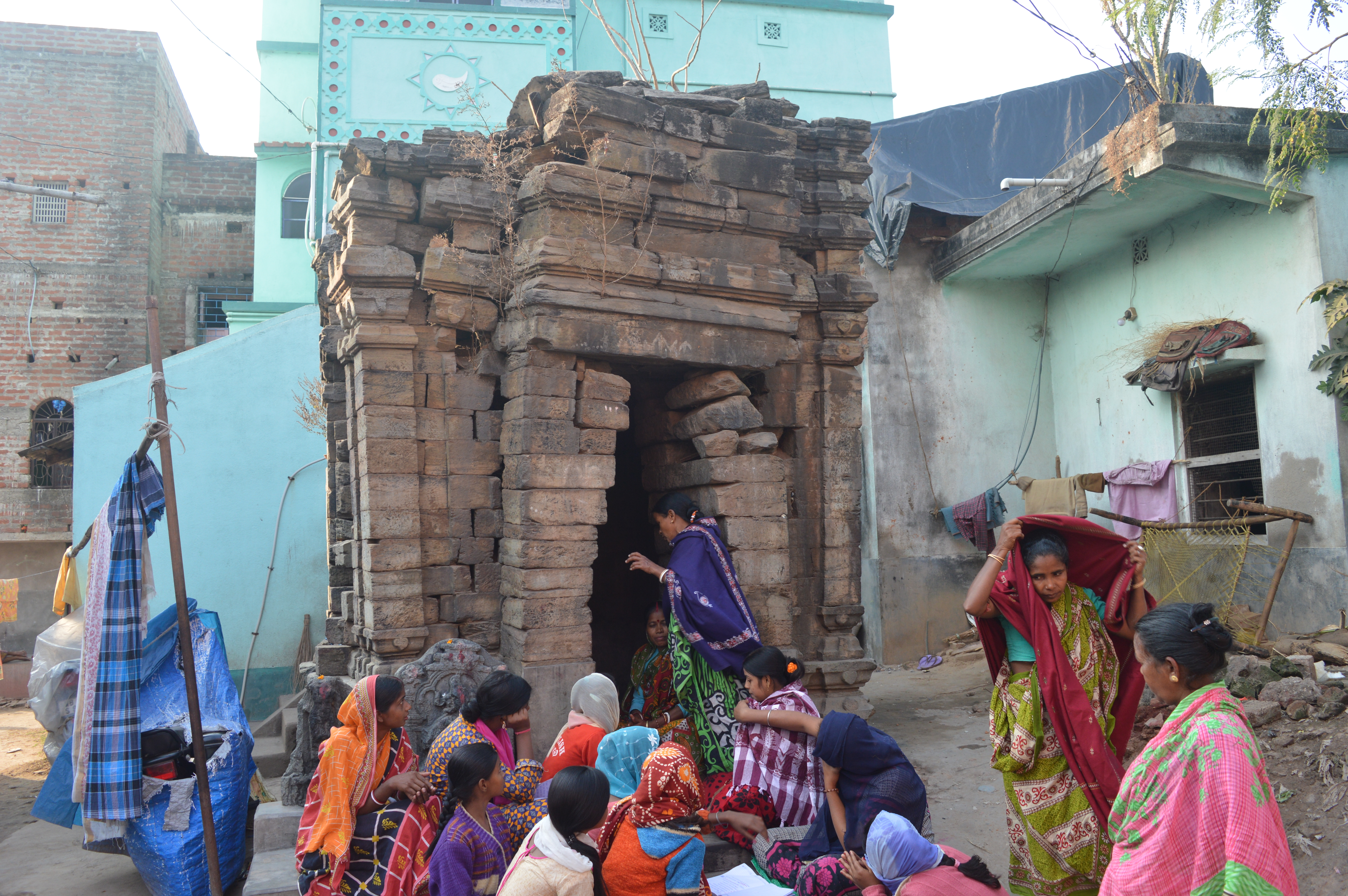
Stone deul at Ambikanagar

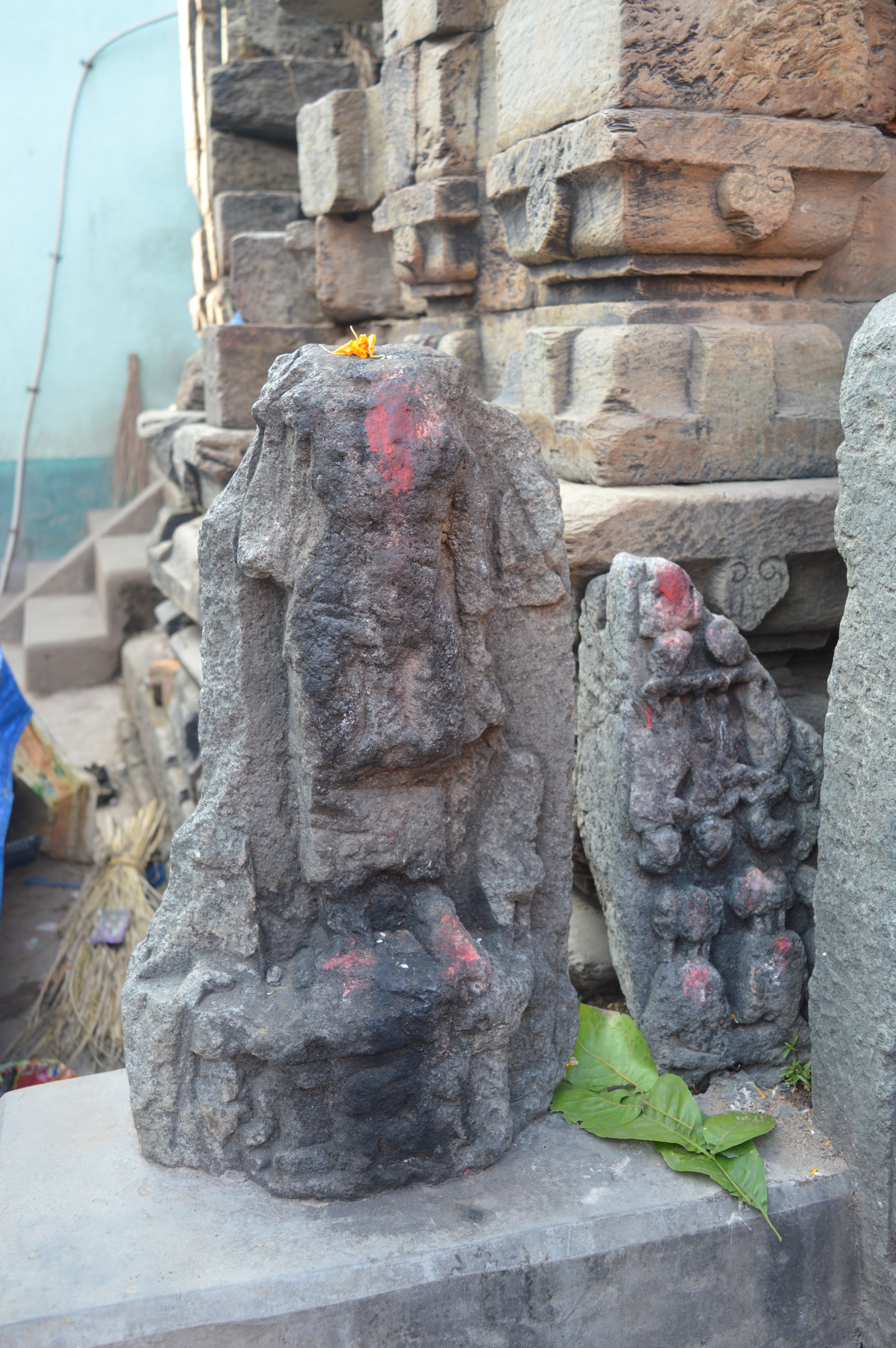
Statues at stone deul

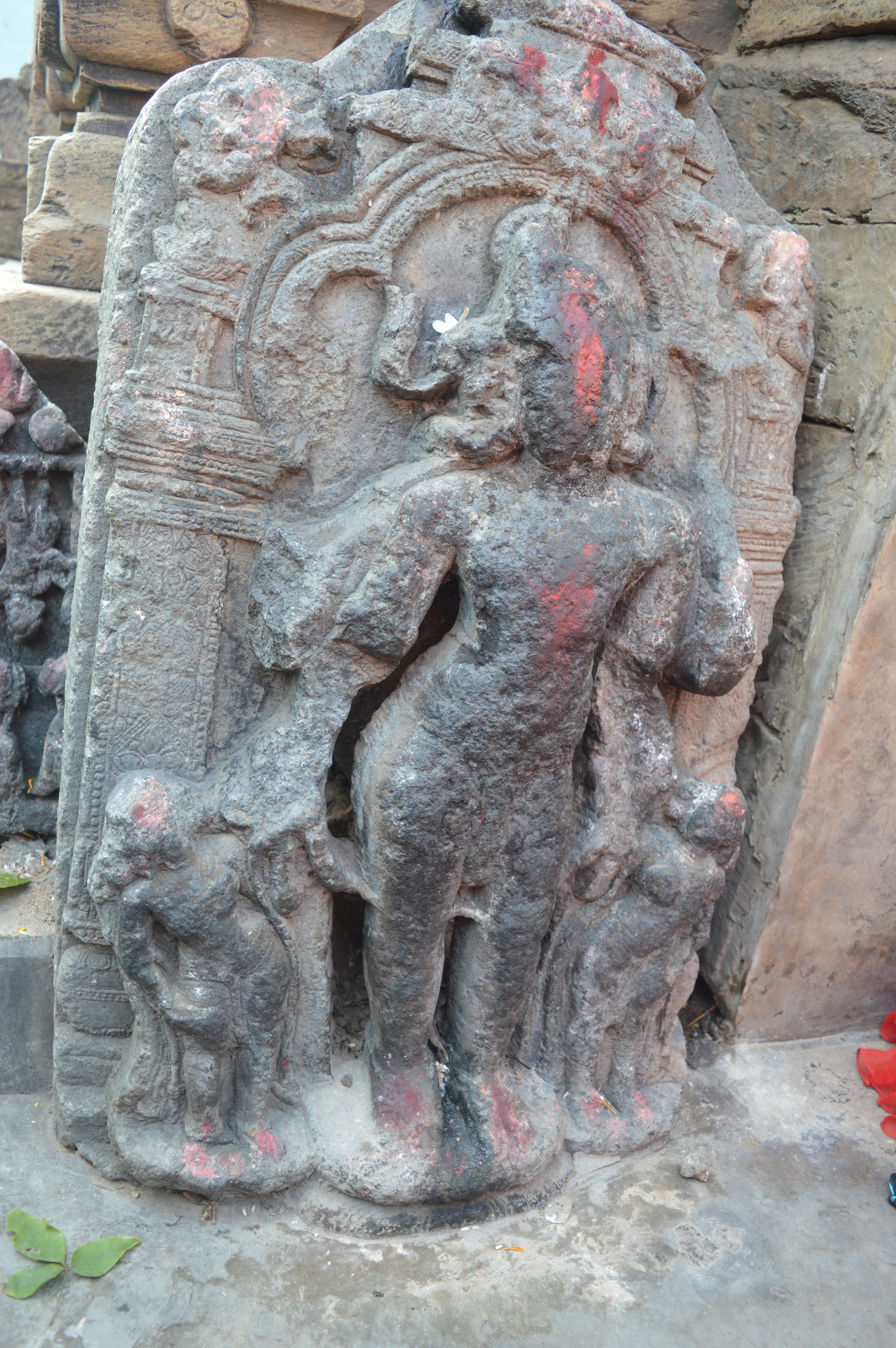
Statue at stone deul

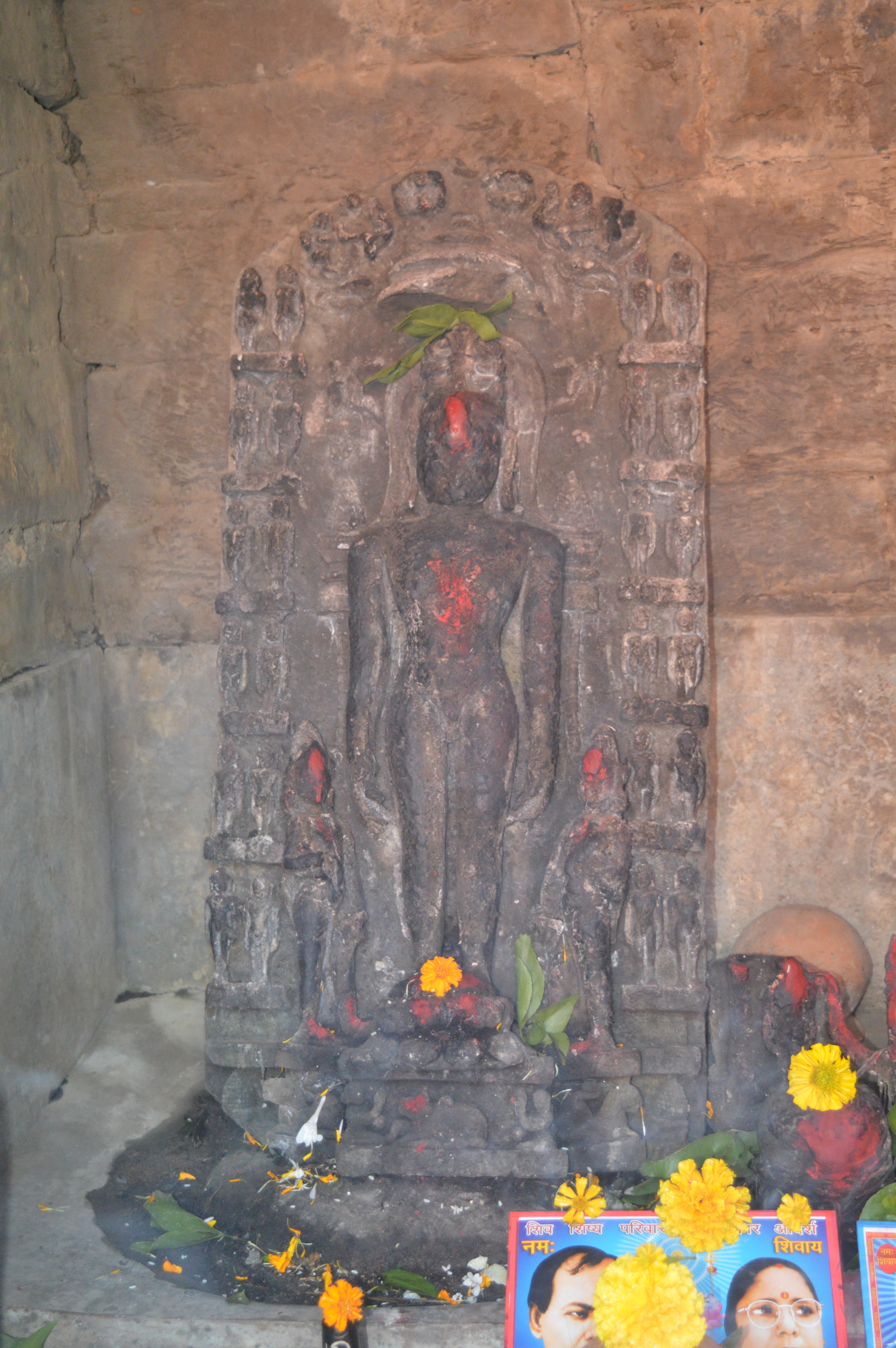
Rishabhnath statue at stone deul

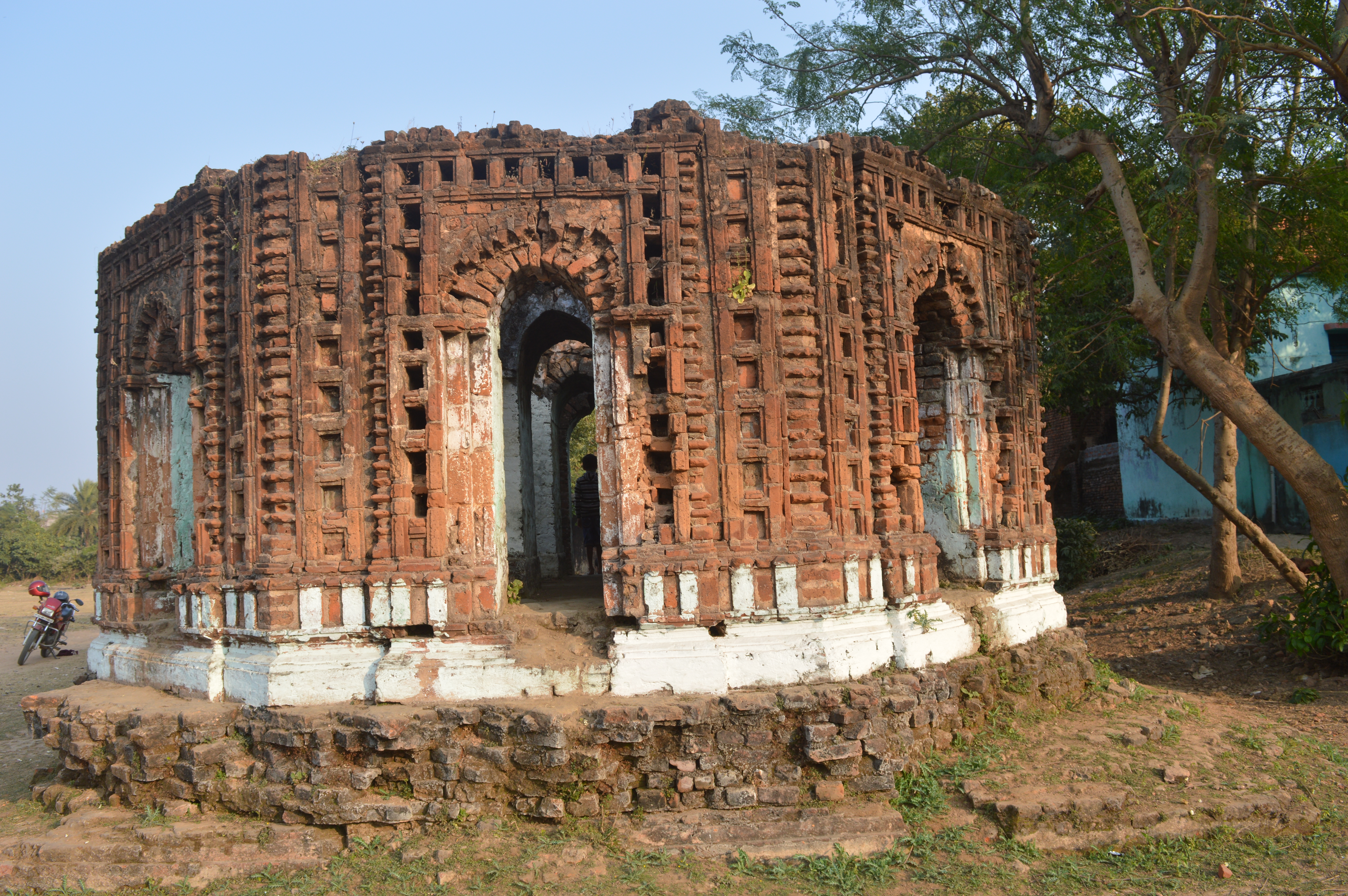
Rasmancha

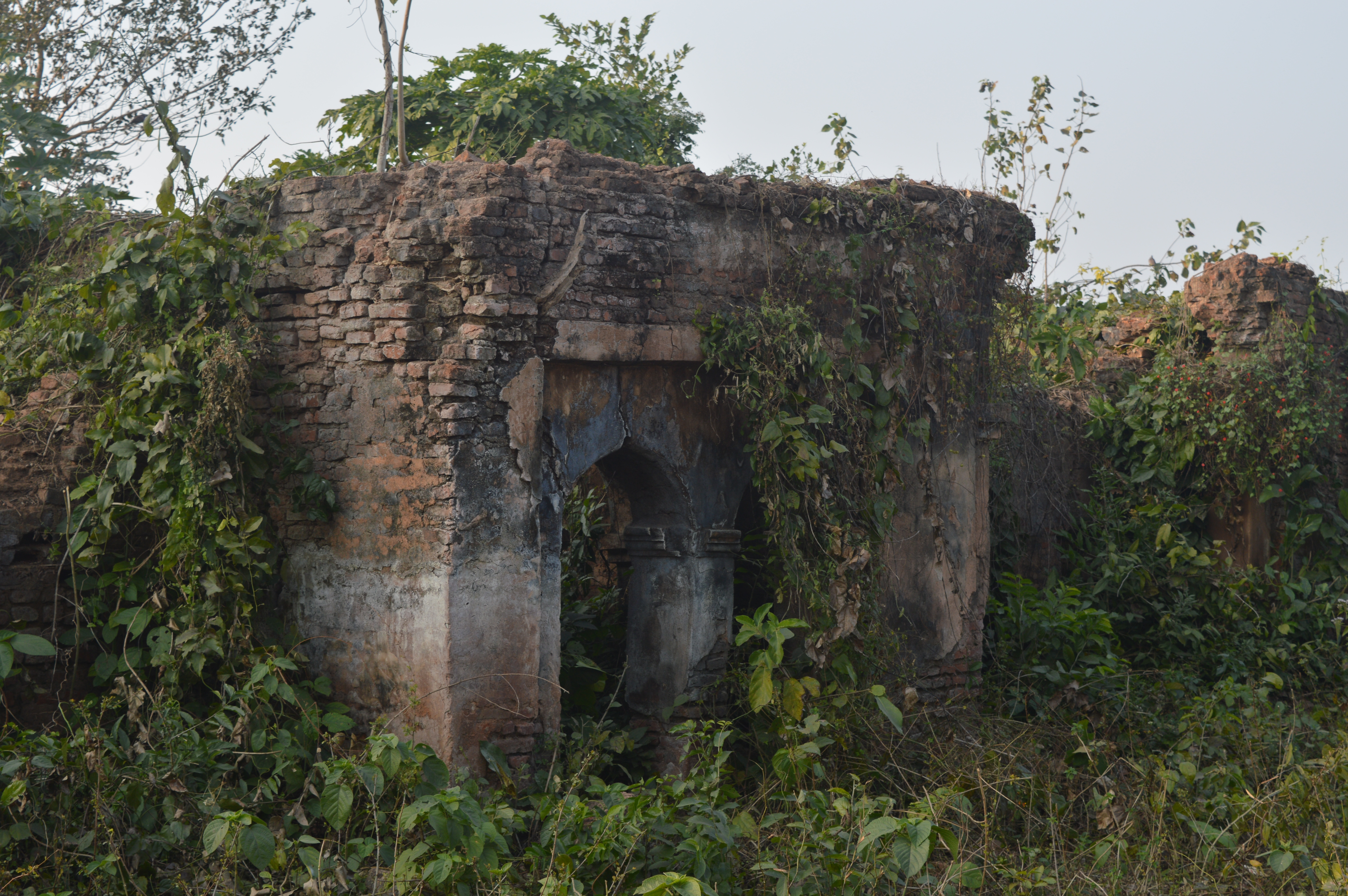
Ruined palace at Ambikanagar

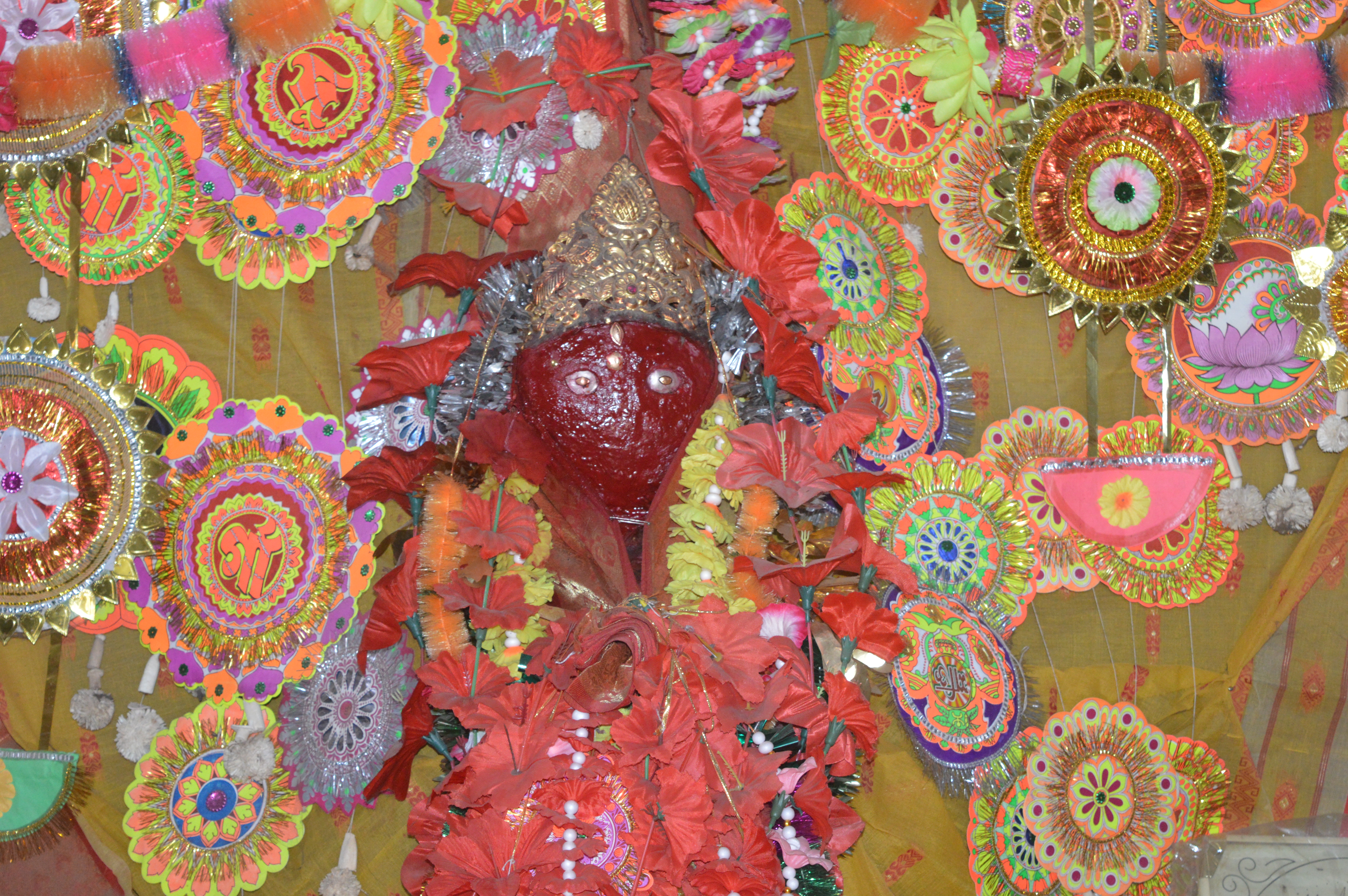
Stone statue of Jain deity Ambika, worshipped as the Hindu goddess Ambika in a modern temple

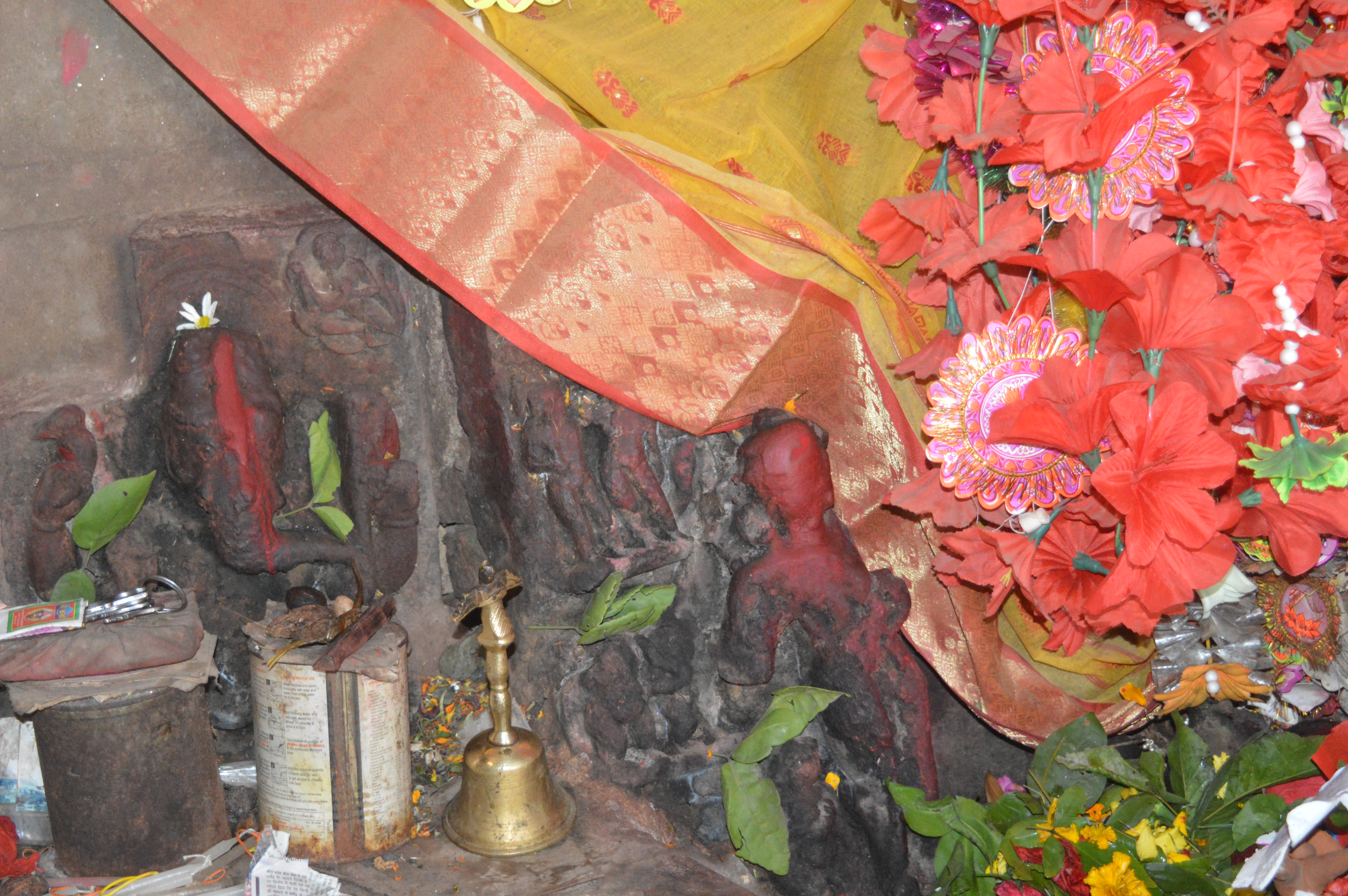
Deities accompanying Ambika
