= Bahulara Ancient Temple =

Temple in India

- সিদ্ধেশ্বর মন্দির śiddheśśor mondir
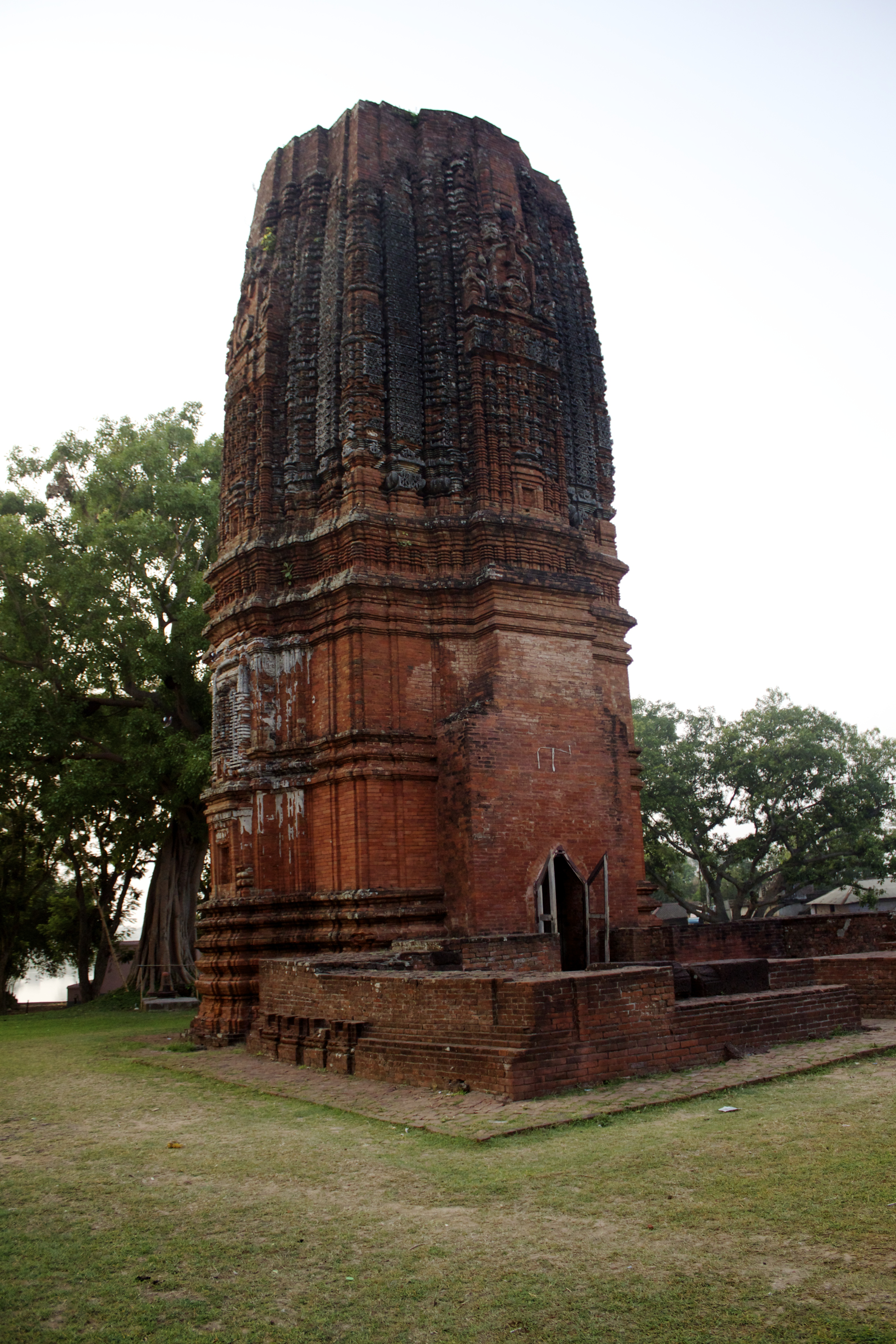

Religion
- Affiliation: Buddhism/ Jainism/ Hinduism
- District: Bankura
- Deity: Shiva, Parshvanatha

Location
- Location: Bahulara
- State: West Bengal
- Country: India
- Interactive map of Bahulara Ancient Temple
- Coordinates: 23°09′58.08″N 87°14′06.86″E

Architecture
- Type: Bengal temple architecture
- Style: Rekha deul style
- Founder: Unknown & Malla Dynasty
- Completed: 11th-12th century
- Elevation: 19.2 m (63 ft)
- Monument of National Importance
- Official name: Ancient Temple
- Type: Cultural
- Reference no.: IN-WB-7

Bahulara Ancient Temple is located in Bahulara village in the Onda II village panchayat, in the Onda CD block in the Bankura Sadar subdivision of the Bankura district in the Indian state of West Bengal. It is 5 km (3.1 mi) from Ondagram railway station and 25 km (16 mi) from Bishnupur.

== Geography ==
Places in Bankura Sadar subdivision in Bankura district
M: municipal town/ city, CT: census town, R: rural/ urban centre, H: hill centre, T: temple/ religious centre, B: barrage
Owing to space constraints in the small map, the actual locations in a larger map may vary slightly

=== Location ===
Bahulara is located at 23.1694°N 87.2389°E.

Note: The map alongside presents some of the notable locations in the subdivision. All places marked in the map are linked in the larger full screen map.

== Siddheshwara temple ==
The Siddheshwara Shiva temple at Bahulara is well known for its unique architectural style and exquisite cut-brick and lime-stucco ornamentation of the walls. This temple is one of the oldest of its types with sikhara of Nagara style. Possibly it was built sometime approximately around 8th-11th century CE as a Jain/Buddhist shrine and later on got reconsecrated as a shaivite monument by the Malla monarchs of Bishnupur. Other than the central Shiva lingam the sanctum sanctorum or the garbhagriha has figurines of Ganesha, Jain tirthankar Parshvsanatha and one of Mahisasurmardini. But the temple is dedicated to Siddhesvara Mahadeva. Height of this temple is 19.2 metre at present.

Situated on the banks of the Dwarakeswar River, "Siddheshwara temple at Bahulara in the Bankura district is probably the finest specimen of a brick built rekha deul temple of medieval period now standing in Bengal," according to Nalini Bhattasali. The topmost portion of the spire, called the amalaka, has been damaged at some point in the past, and furthermore in spite of recent restorative efforts by the government much of the temple's original ornamentations had fallen prey to the ravages of time. In the month of Chaitra the Bahulara Shiva Gajan takes place over the span of three days with hundreds of devotees attending the festival.

Temple at Bahulara photographed by an unknown photographer in 1897. Presently in the collection of Leiden University

== Buddhist and Jain centre ==
According to Binoy Ghosh, the various habitational and ritualistic mounds surrounding the temple at Bahulara have led archaeologists to speculate that it was a thriving Buddhist centre at some ancient point of time. The series of brick and stone-crafted mounds beside the deul are believed to be the ruins of Buddhist stupas where the remains of Buddhist bhikkhus and bhikkhunis were entombed after cremation. Prior to the dominance of Shaivism and Shaktism, the area was influenced by Buddhism and Jainism from the late millenniums BCE to the early centuries CE until roughly the cusp of the 7th and 8th centuries CE when the kingdom of Mallabhum was established. Archaeologists feel that the temple was built in the Pala era. Ananda Coomaraswamy believes that the present deul was built in the 10th century. Others feel that it could be a century or two later. Jatar Deul, in the Sundarbans, came up during the same period. The temples at Dihar, in Bankura district, are also rekh deuls.

== Rekha deul ==
David J. McCutchion says that the pre-dominant traditional architectural style for temples in the western areas of Bengal in the pre-Muslim period is the tall curvilinear rekha deul and it went on developing from the late 7th century or early 8th century to around the 12th century, increasing its complexity and height but retaining its basic features. Such temples had “curvilinear shikhara with chaitya mesh decoration, surmounted by a large amalaka and kalasa finial. Examples of such dilapidated deuls are still standing at Satdeula (in Bardhaman), Bahulara and Sonatapal (in Bankura) and Deulghat (in Purulia). On the brick deuls already mentioned here, plus Jatar (in 24 Parganas) and Para (in Purulia), “we find extensive and remarkably fine stucco work on carved brick”.

According to the List of Monuments of National Importance in West Bengal the Ancient Temple at Bahulara is an ASI listed monument.

== Bahulara picture gallery ==
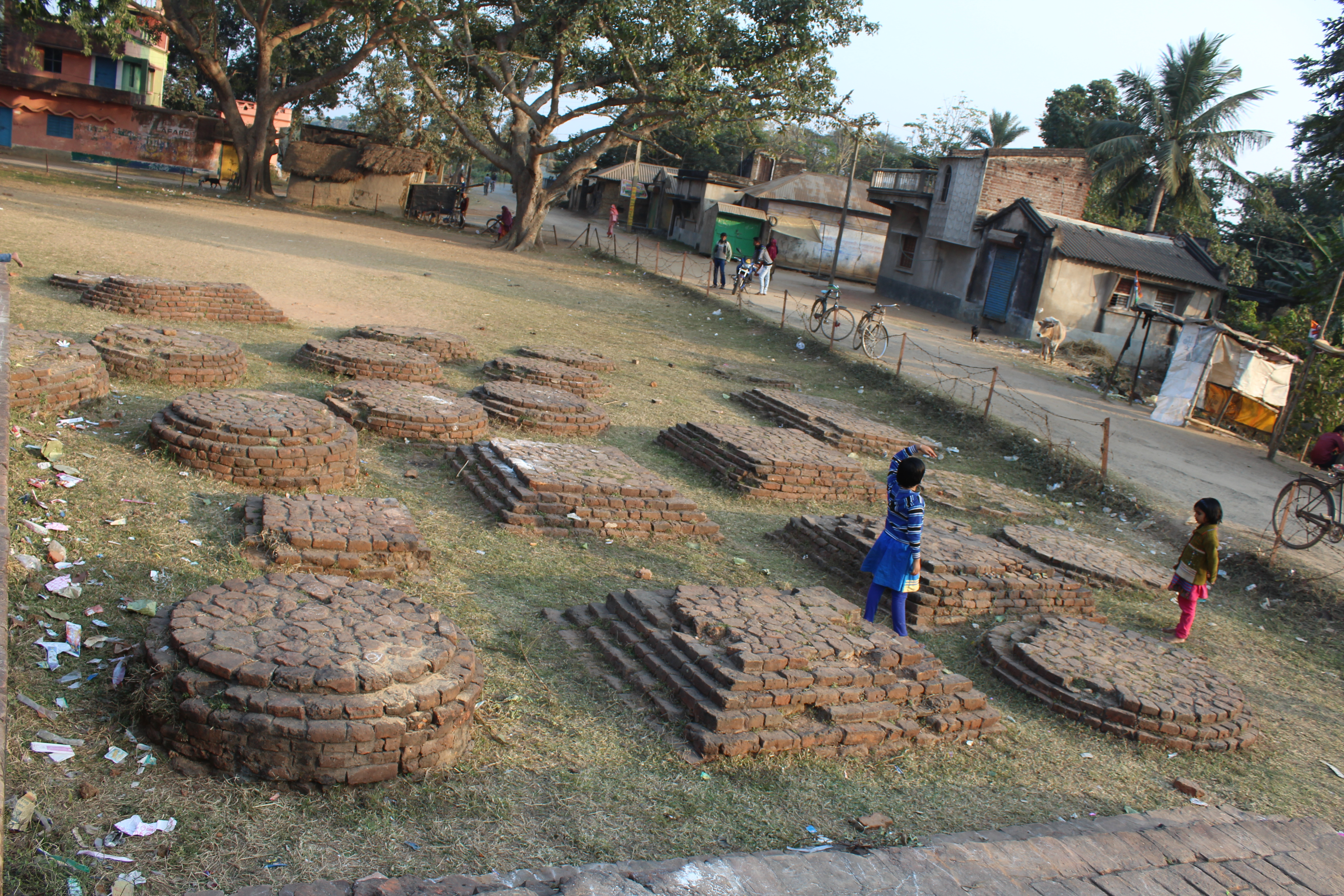
View outside

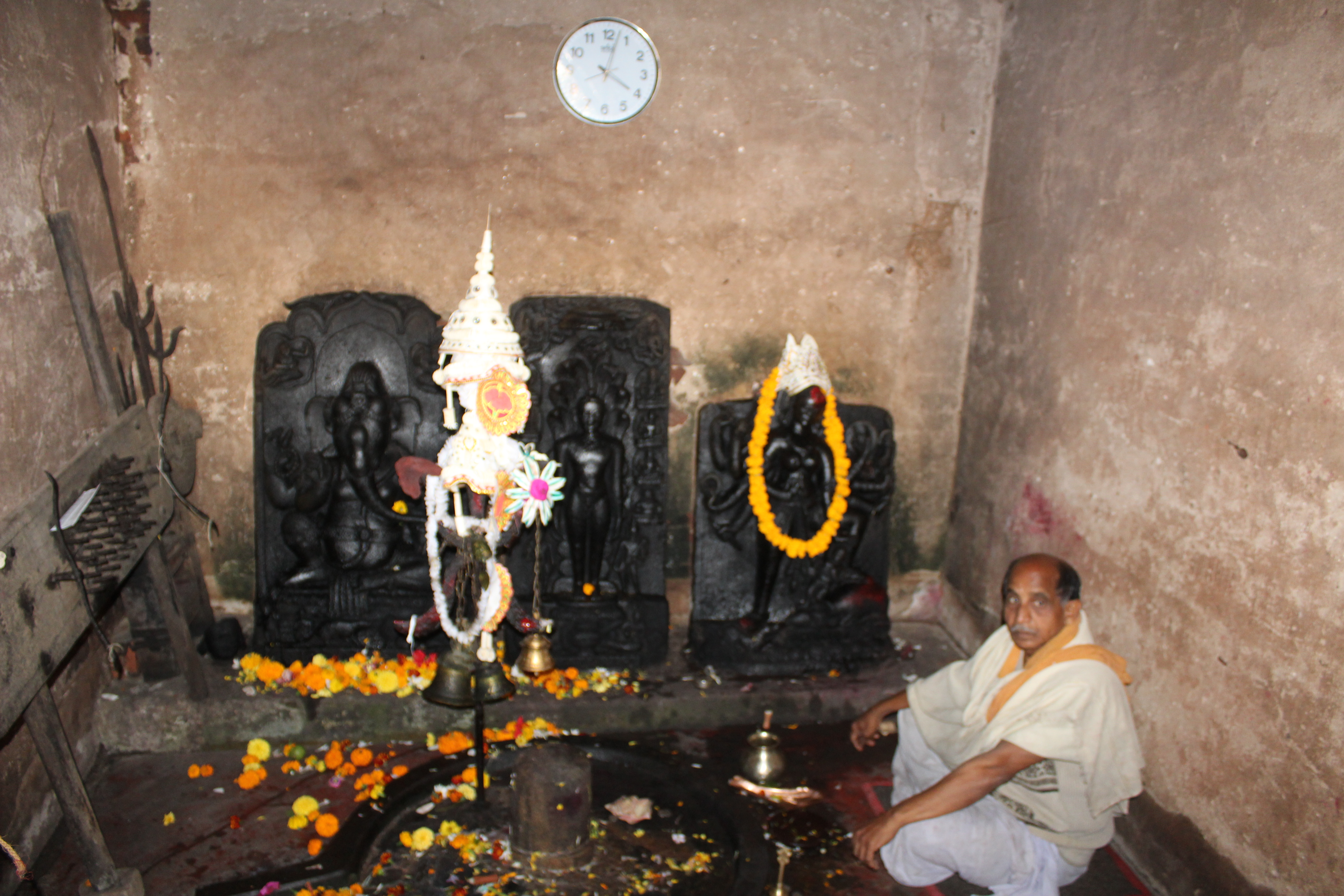
The deities

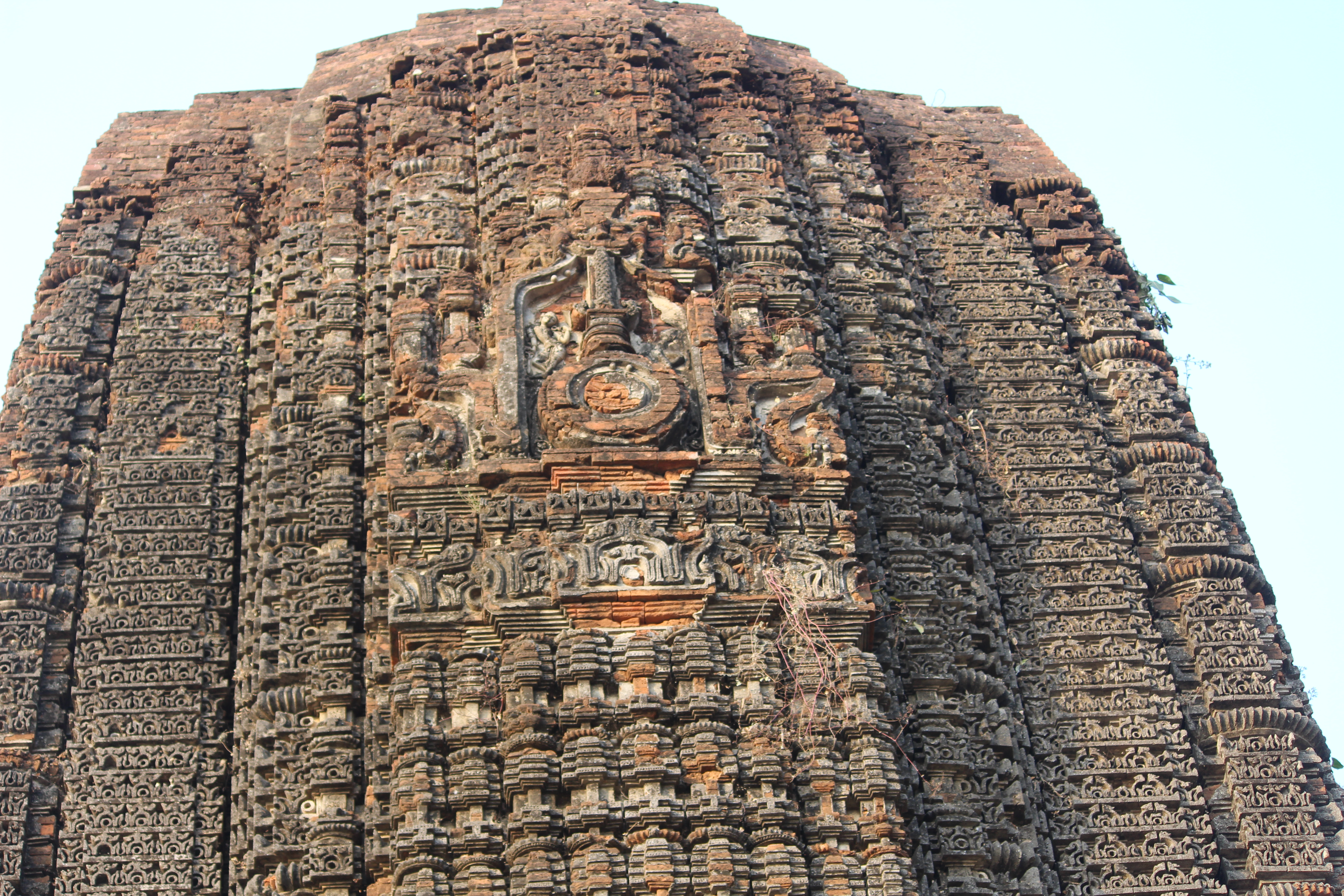
Wall decorations

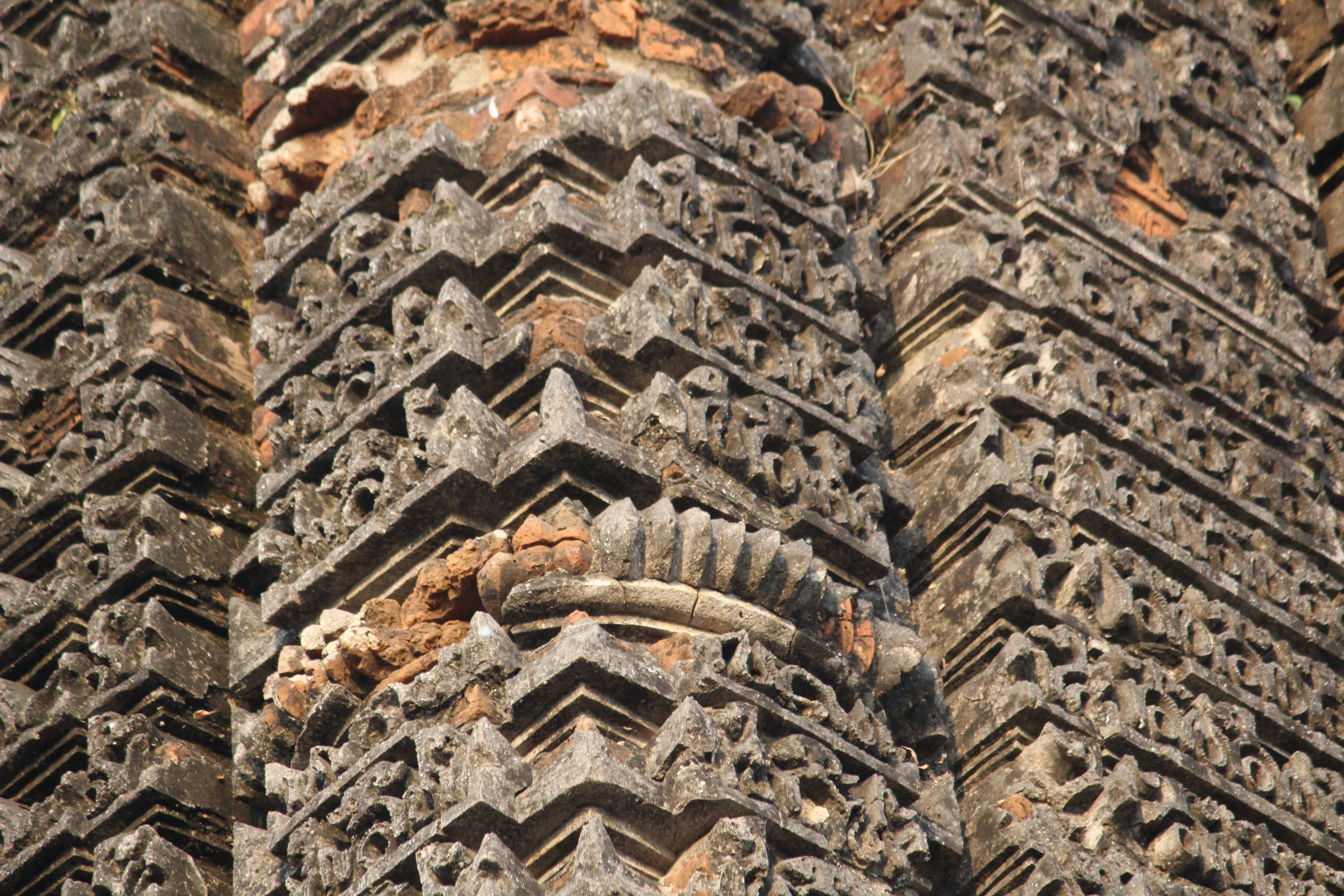
Wall decorations

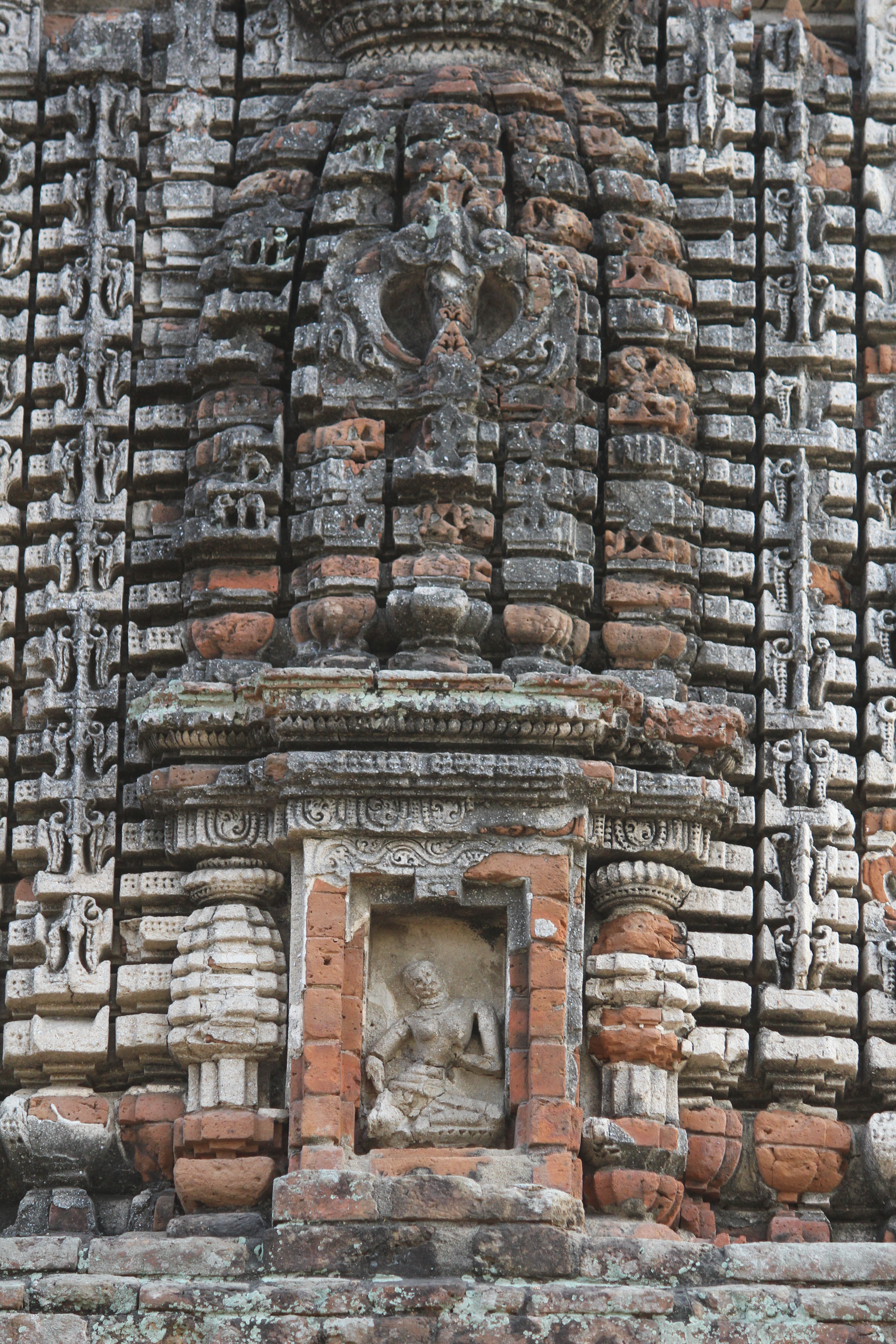
Wall decorations

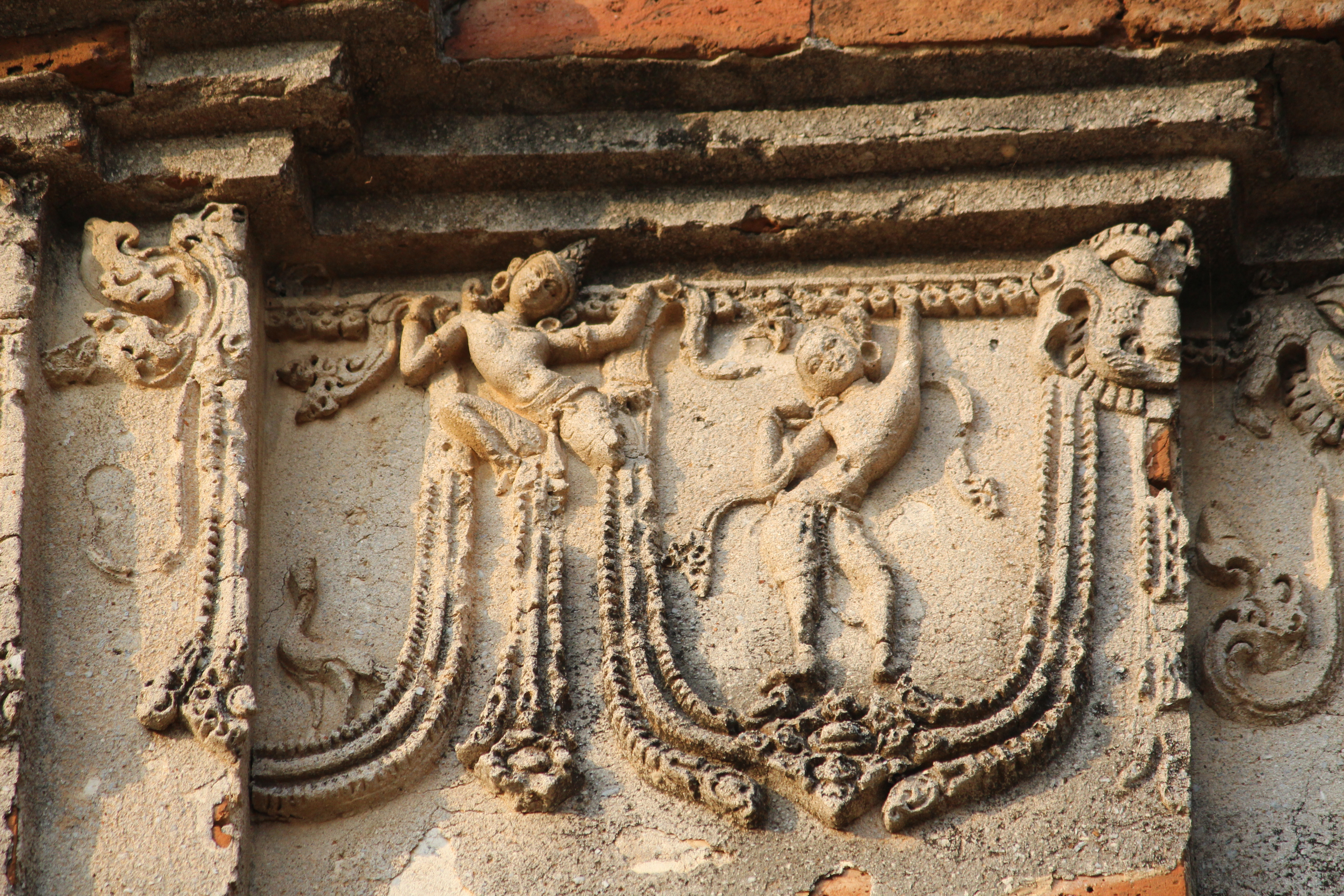
Wall decorators

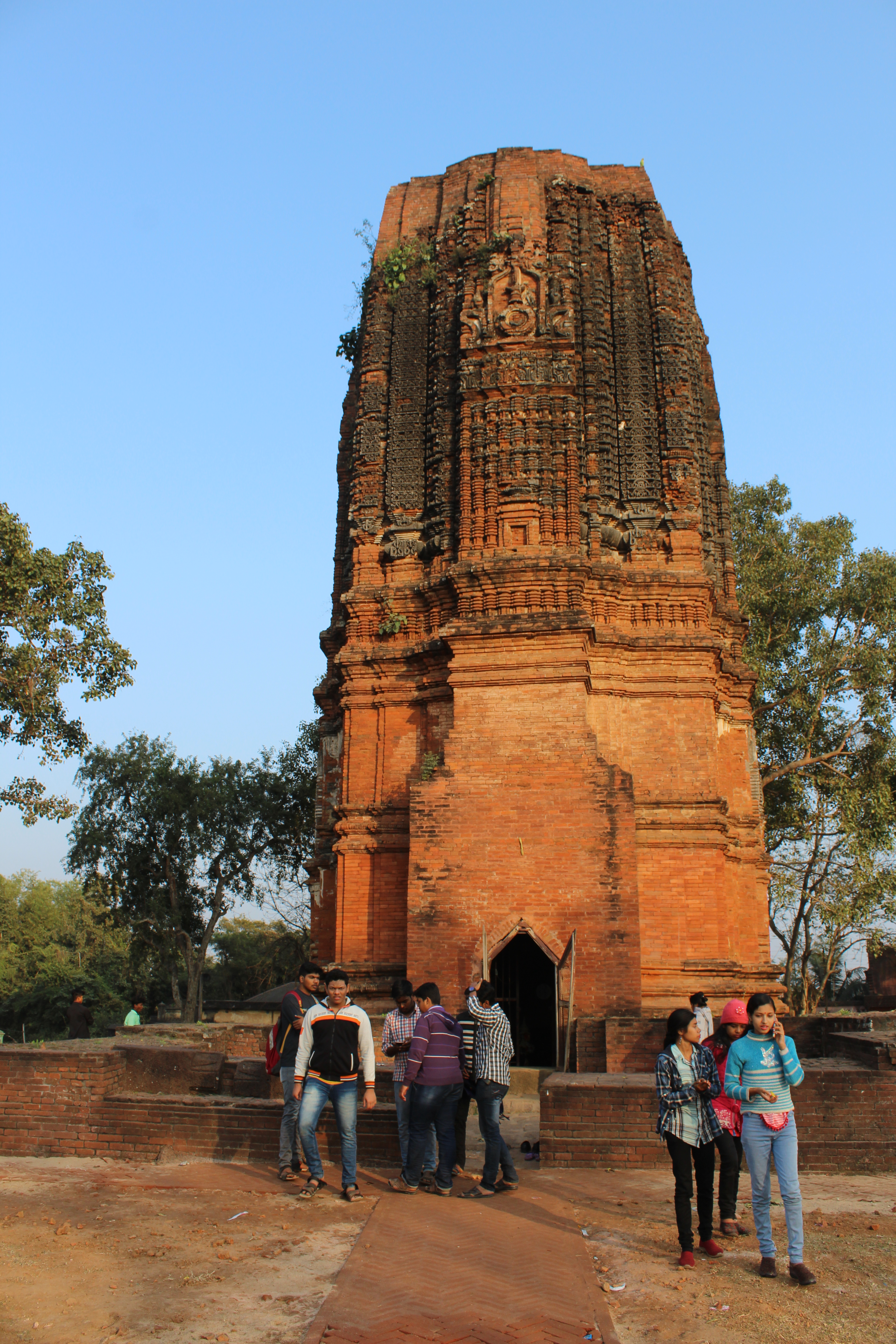
Visitors
