= Dihi Baliharpur =

- Village
- Location in West Bengal, India Dihi Baliharpur (India)
- Coordinates: 22.6073°N 87.7356°E
- Country: India
- State: West Bengal
- District: Paschim Medinipur

Population (2011)
  - Total: 867

Languages
  - Official: Bengali, English
- Time zone: UTC+5:30 (IST)
- PIN: 721211
- Telephone/STD code: 03225
- Lok Sabha constituency: Ghatal
- Vidhan Sabha constituency: Daspur
- Website: paschimmedinipur.gov.in

Dihi Baliharpur is a village in the Daspur I CD block in the Ghatal subdivision of the Paschim Medinipur district in the state of West Bengal, India.

== Geography ==
Cities and towns in Ghatal subdivision of Paschim Medinipur district
M: municipal city/ town, R: rural/ urban centre, H: historical/ religious centre
Owing to space constraints in the small map, the actual locations in a larger map may vary slightly

=== Location ===
Dihi Baliharpur is located at 22.6073°N 87.7356°E.

=== Area overview ===
Ishwar Chandra Vidyasagar, scholar, social reformer and a key figure of the Bengal Renaissance, was born at Birsingha on 26 September 1820.

Ghatal subdivision, shown in the map alongside, has alluvial soils. Around 85% of the total cultivated area is cropped more than once. It has a density of population of 1,099 per km^{2}, but being a small subdivision only a little over a fifth of the people in the district reside in this subdivision. 14.33% of the population lives in urban areas and 86.67% lives in the rural areas.

Note: The map alongside presents some of the notable locations in the subdivision. All places marked in the map are linked in the larger full screen map.

== Demographics ==
According to the 2011 Census of India, Dihi Baliharpur had a total population of 867, of which 456 (53%) were males and 411 (47%) were females. There were 93 persons in the age range of 0–6 years. The total number of literate persons in Dihi Baliharpur was 698 (90.18% of the population over 6 years).

== Culture ==
David J. McCutchion mentions the Dihi Baliharpur temple as richly decorated pancha-ratna with smooth rekha turrets and porch on three arches.

He also mentions two other temples:

- The Brajaraja-Kisora temple as an ek-ratna with smooth rekha tower of the smaller Daspur type generally with the tower displaced to the back, measuring 27' x 22' 6", with rich terracotta facade.
- The Genriburi temple, in the same category as Brajaraja-Kisora temple, measuring 28' 4" x 21' 3", plain, built in 1757.

== Dihi Baliharpur picture gallery ==
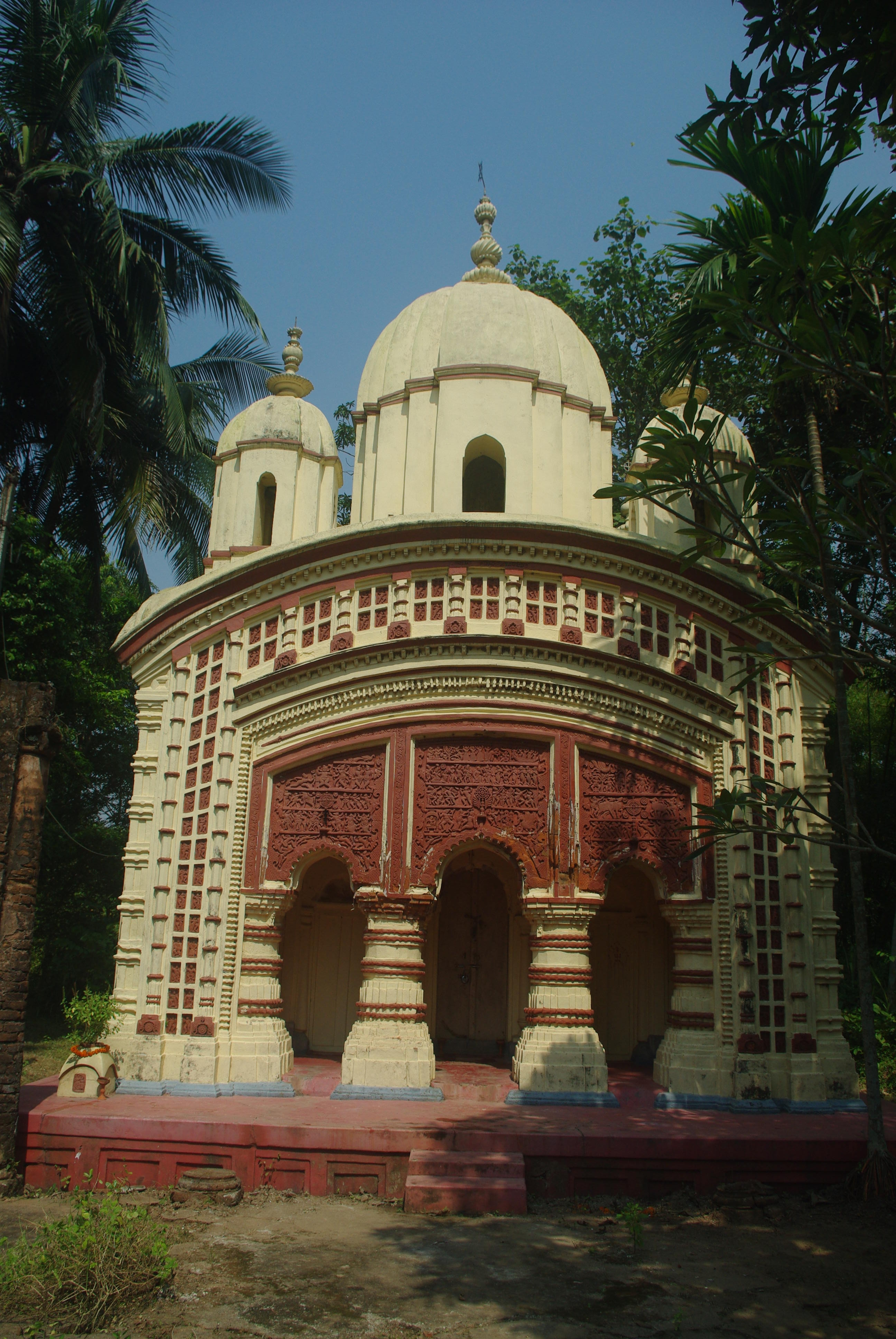
Radha Gobinda temple of Pathak Goswami family

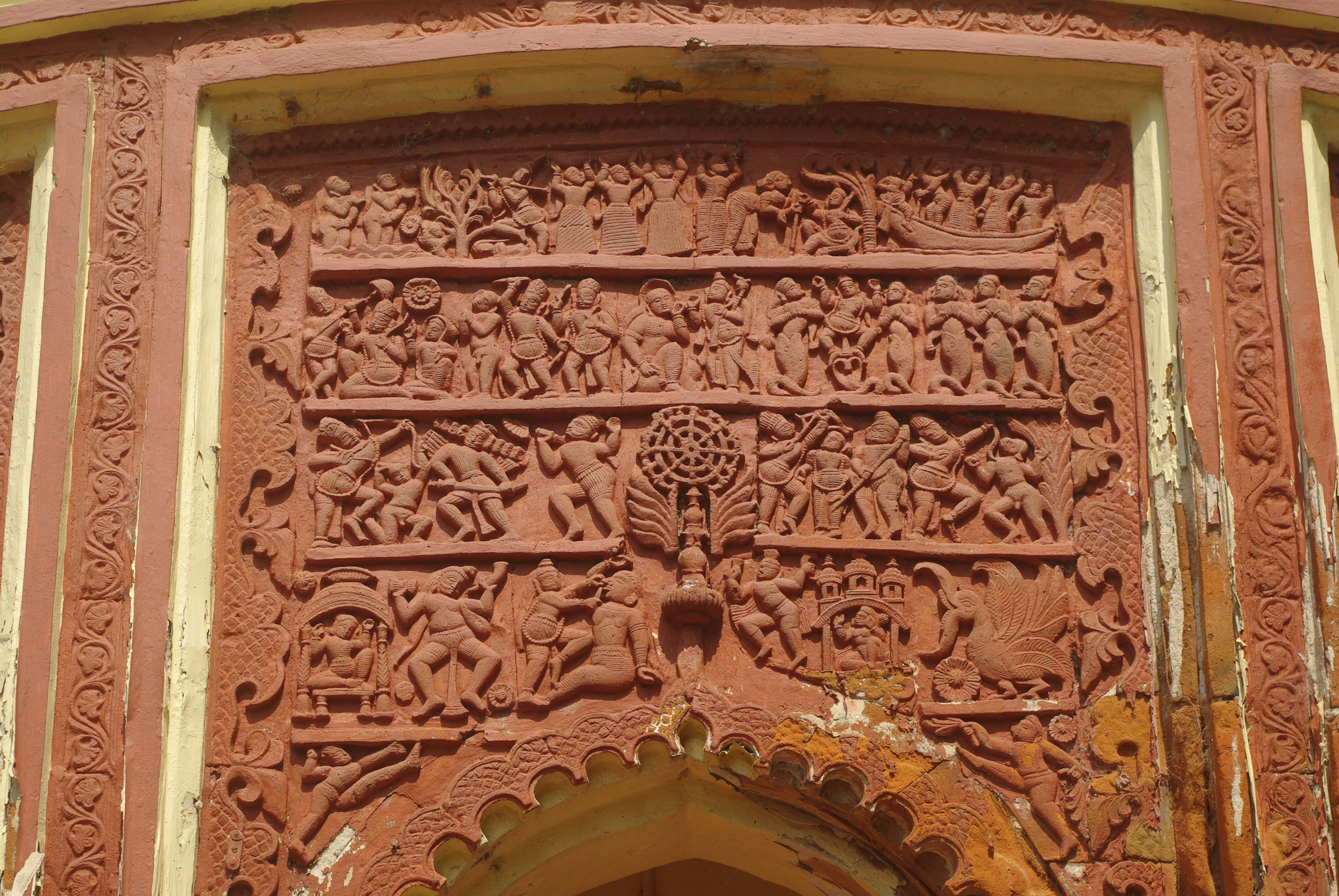
Terracotta panel

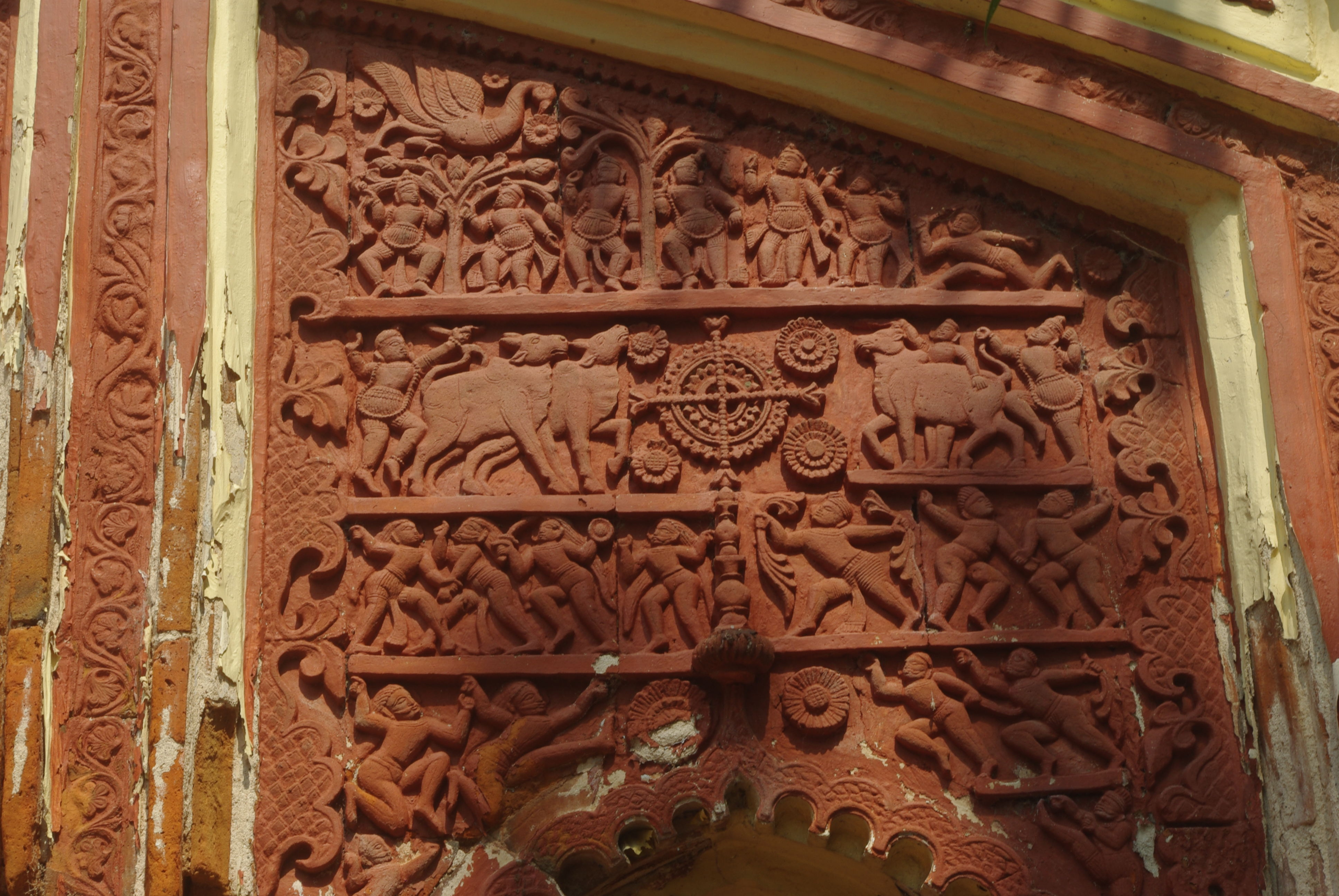
Terracotta panel
