= Shaulan =

- Village
- Location in West Bengal, India Shaulan (India)
- Coordinates: 22.5423°N 87.7046°E
- Country: India
- State: West Bengal
- District: Paschim Medinipur

Population (2011)
  - Total: 867

Languages
  - Official: Bengali, English
- Time zone: UTC+5:30 (IST)
- PIN: 721211
- Telephone/STD code: 03225
- Lok Sabha constituency: Ghatal
- Vidhan Sabha constituency: Daspur
- Website: paschimmedinipur.gov.in

Shaulan (also spelled Saulan) is a village in the Daspur I CD block in the Ghatal subdivision of the Paschim Medinipur district in the state of West Bengal, India.

== Geography ==
Shaulan is located at 22.5423°N 87.7046°E.

== Demographics ==
According to the 2011 Census of India, Shaulan had a total population of 964, of which 469 (49%) were males and 495 (51%) were females. There were 117 persons in the age range of 0–6 years. The total number of literate persons in Shaulan was 702 (82.88% of the population over 6 years).

== Culture ==
David J. McCutchion mentions the Shyama Sundara temple as a standard West Bengal type pancha-ratna having figures in the archway panels and round the facade. Built in the 19th century, it measures 17’ 10" square.

== Shaulan picture gallery ==
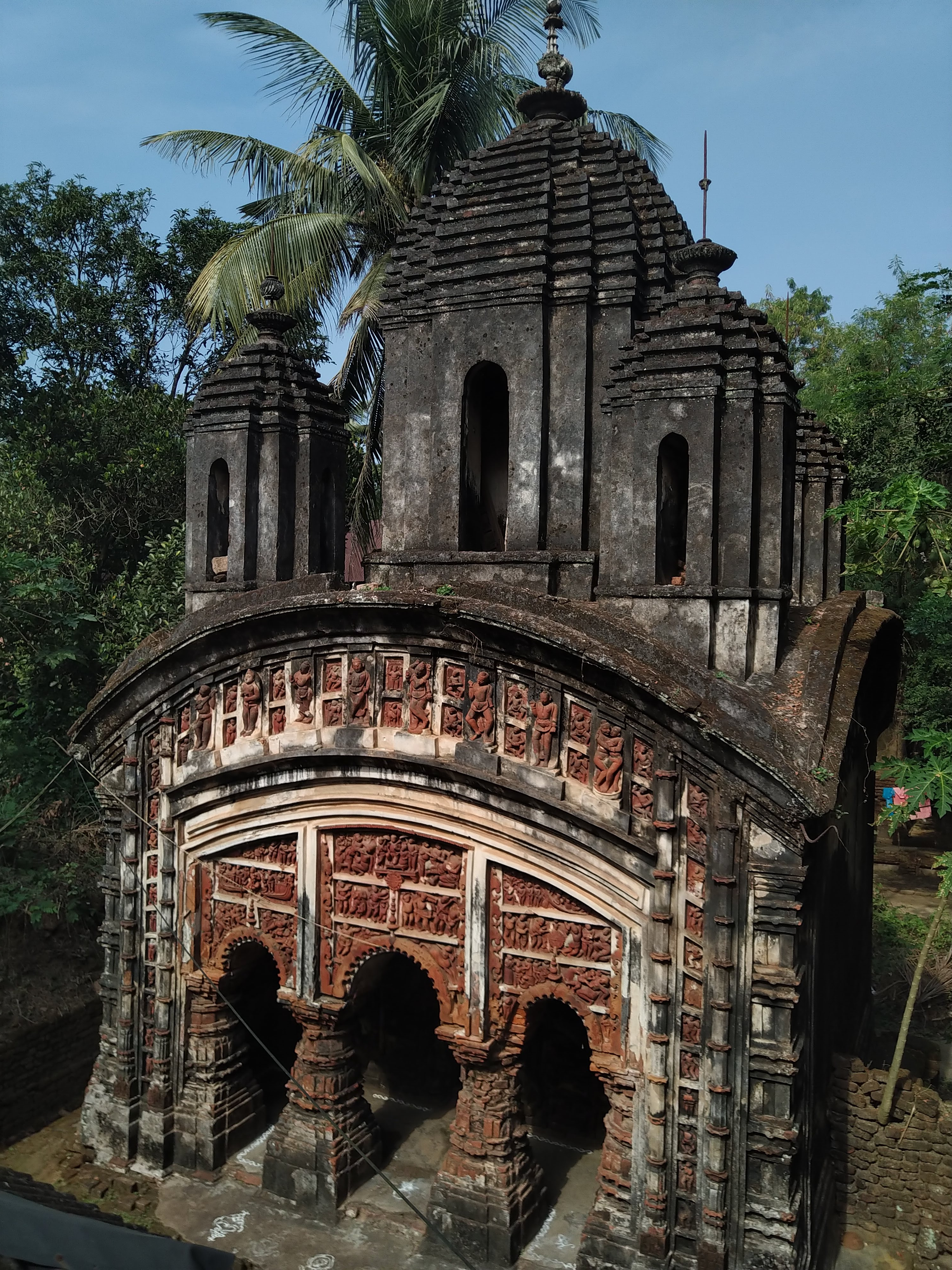
Shyama Sundara pancha-ratna temple constructed by the Adhikari family

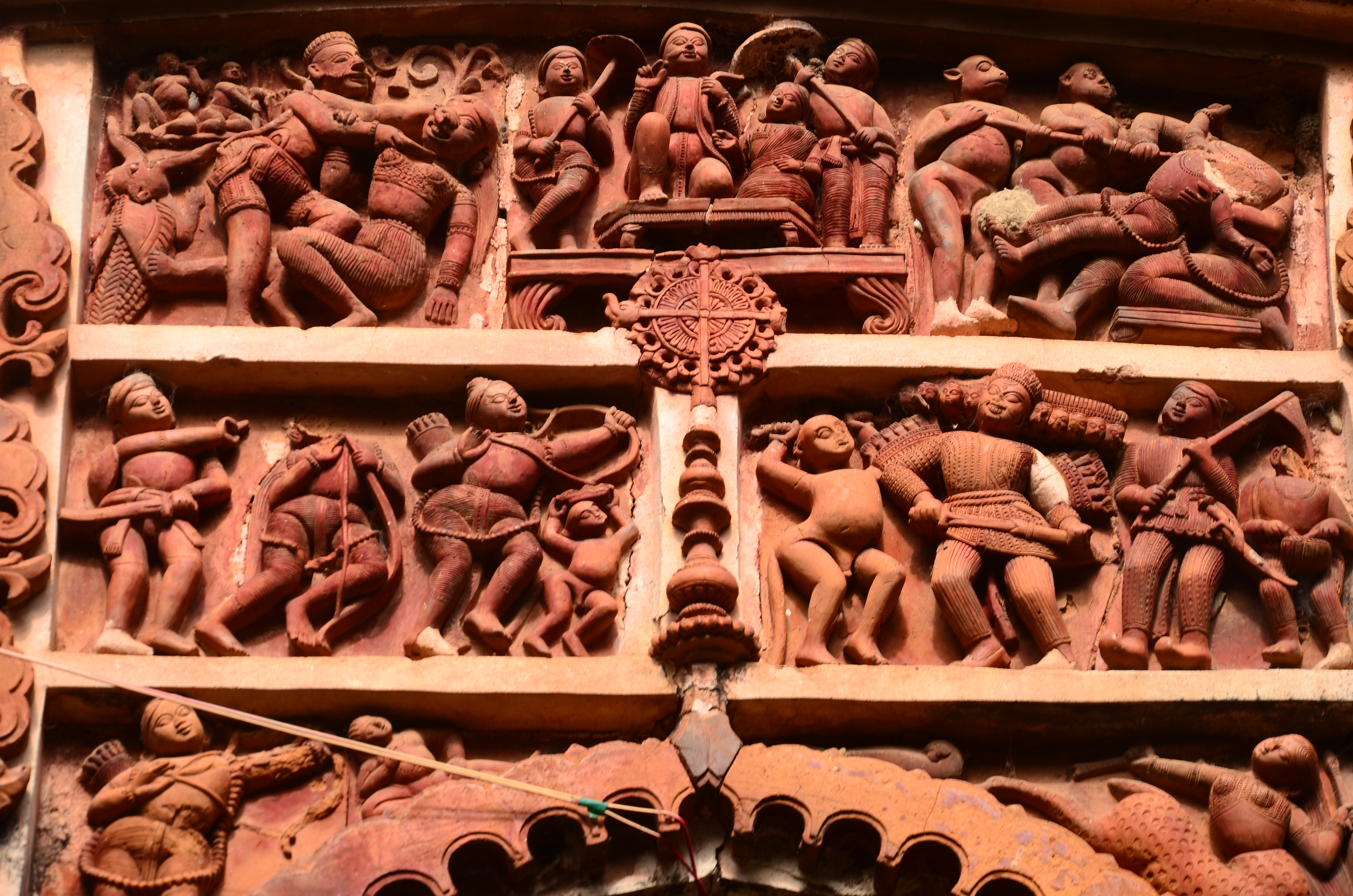
Terracotta panels

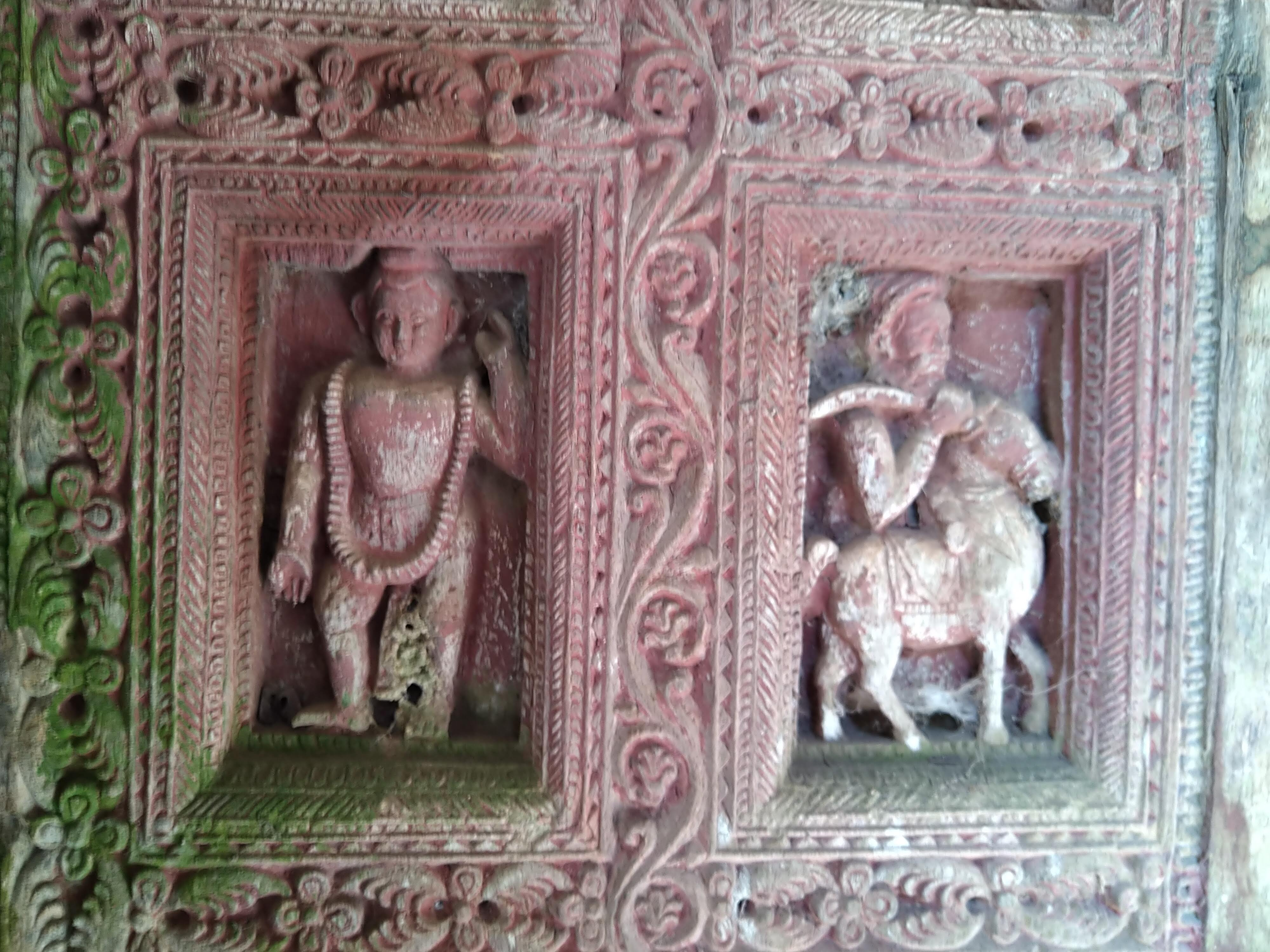
Decorated wooden doorway
