= Radhakantapur =

- Village
- Location in West Bengal, India Radhakantapur (India)
- Coordinates: 22.5603°N 87.7441°E
- Country: India
- State: West Bengal
- District: Paschim Medinipur

Population (2011)
  - Total: 2,473

Languages
  - Official: Bengali, English
- Time zone: UTC+5:30 (IST)
- PIN: 721211
- Telephone/STD code: 03225
- Lok Sabha constituency: Ghatal
- Vidhan Sabha constituency: Daspur
- Website: paschimmedinipur.gov.in

Radhakantapur is a village in the Daspur I CD block in the Ghatal subdivision of the Paschim Medinipur district in the state of West Bengal, India.

== Geography ==
Cities and towns in Ghatal subdivision of Paschim Medinipur district
M: municipal city/ town, R: rural/ urban centre, H: historical/ religious centre
Owing to space constraints in the small map, the actual locations in a larger map may vary slightly

=== Location ===
Radhakantapur is located at 22.5603°N 87.7441°E.

=== Area overview ===
Ishwar Chandra Vidyasagar, scholar, social reformer and a key figure of the Bengal Renaissance, was born at Birsingha on 26 September 1820.

Ghatal subdivision, shown in the map alongside, has alluvial soils. Around 85% of the total cultivated area is cropped more than once. It has a density of population of 1,099 per km^{2}, but being a small subdivision only a little over a fifth of the people in the district reside in this subdivision. 14.33% of the population lives in urban areas and 86.67% lives in the rural areas.

Note: The map alongside presents some of the notable locations in the subdivision. All places marked in the map are linked in the larger full screen map.

== Demographics ==
According to the 2011 Census of India, Radhakantapur had a total population of 2,473, of which 1,242 (50%) were males and 1,231 (50%) were females. There were 281 persons in the age range of 0–6 years. The total number of literate persons in Radhakantapur was 1,749 (79.79% of the population over 6 years).

== Education ==
Radhakantapur High School is a Bengali-medium coeducational institution established in 1966. The school has facilities for teaching from class V to class XII. It has a library with 612 books, 1 computer and a playground.

== Culture ==
David J. McCutchion classifies the Gopinath (mentioned as Panchananda) temple as an ek-ratna of the smaller Daspur type, measuring 22’ x 28’, with rich terracotta façade. He classifies the Dadhibamna temple (name not mentioned, only place mentioned) as a richly decorated pancha-ratna with smooth rekha turrets.

The Gopinath temple is a state protected monument.

== Radhakantapur picture gallery ==
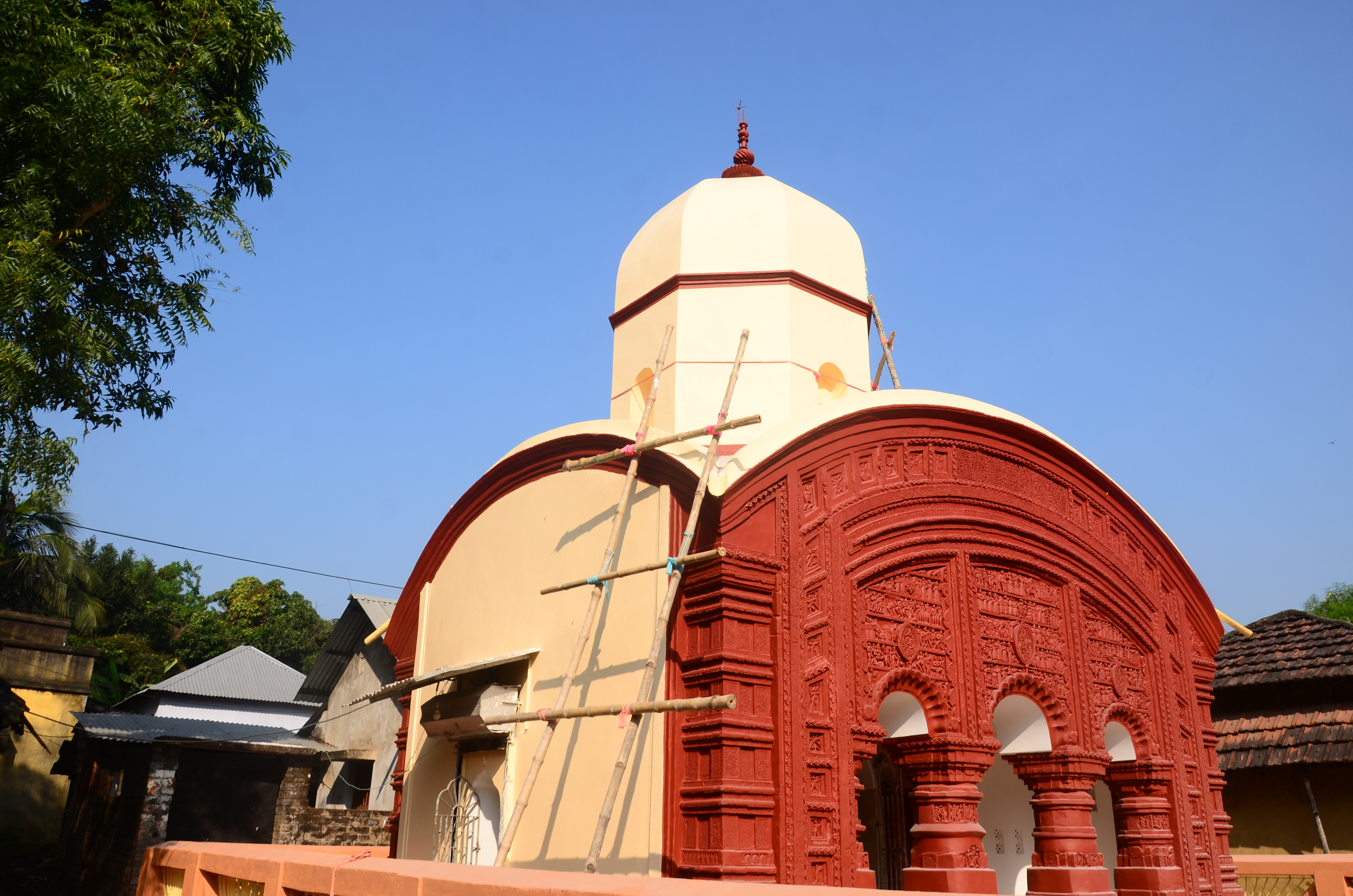
Ek-ratna Gopinath temple, established in 1844 and owned by the Das family

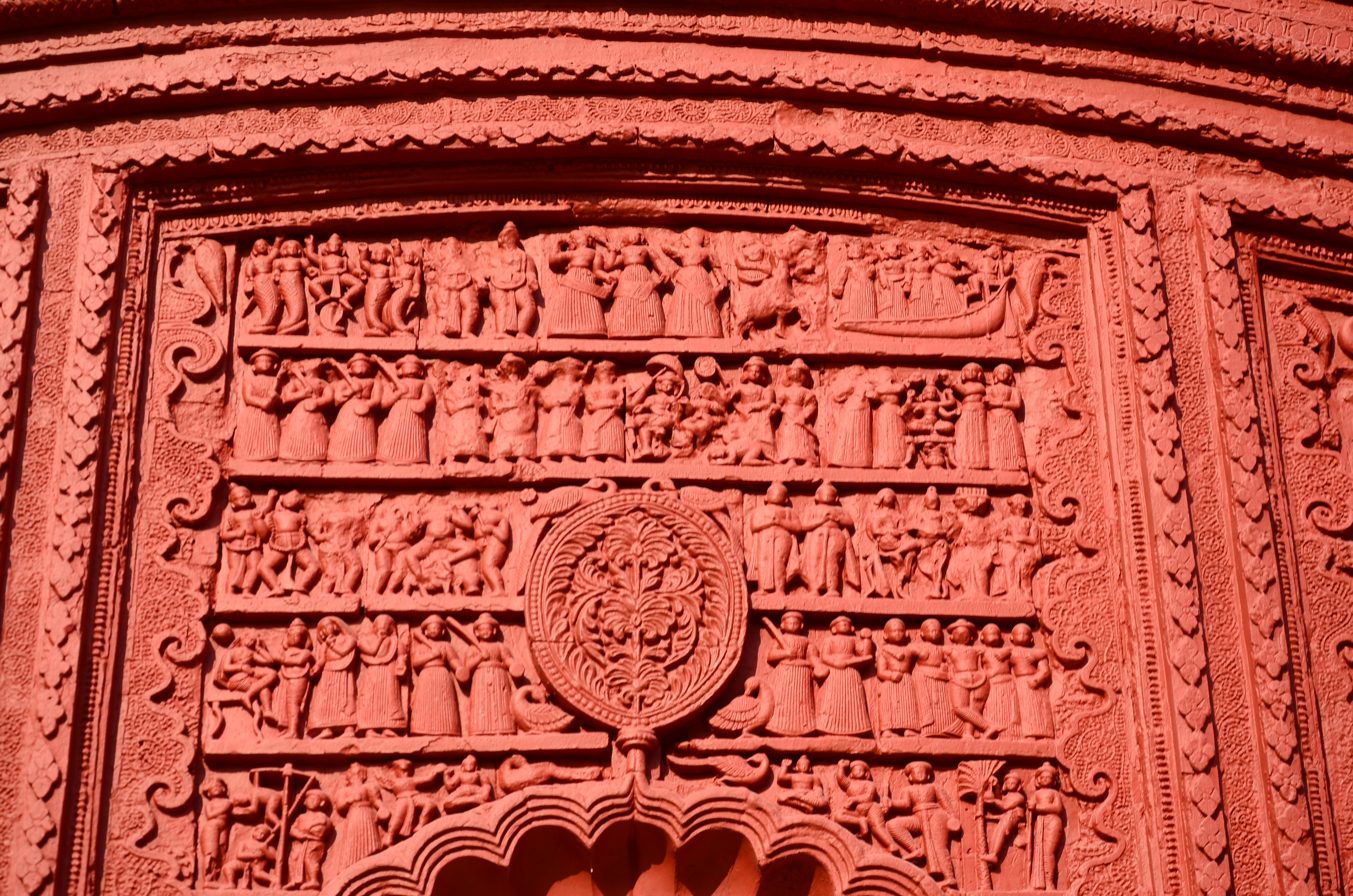
Terracotta panel

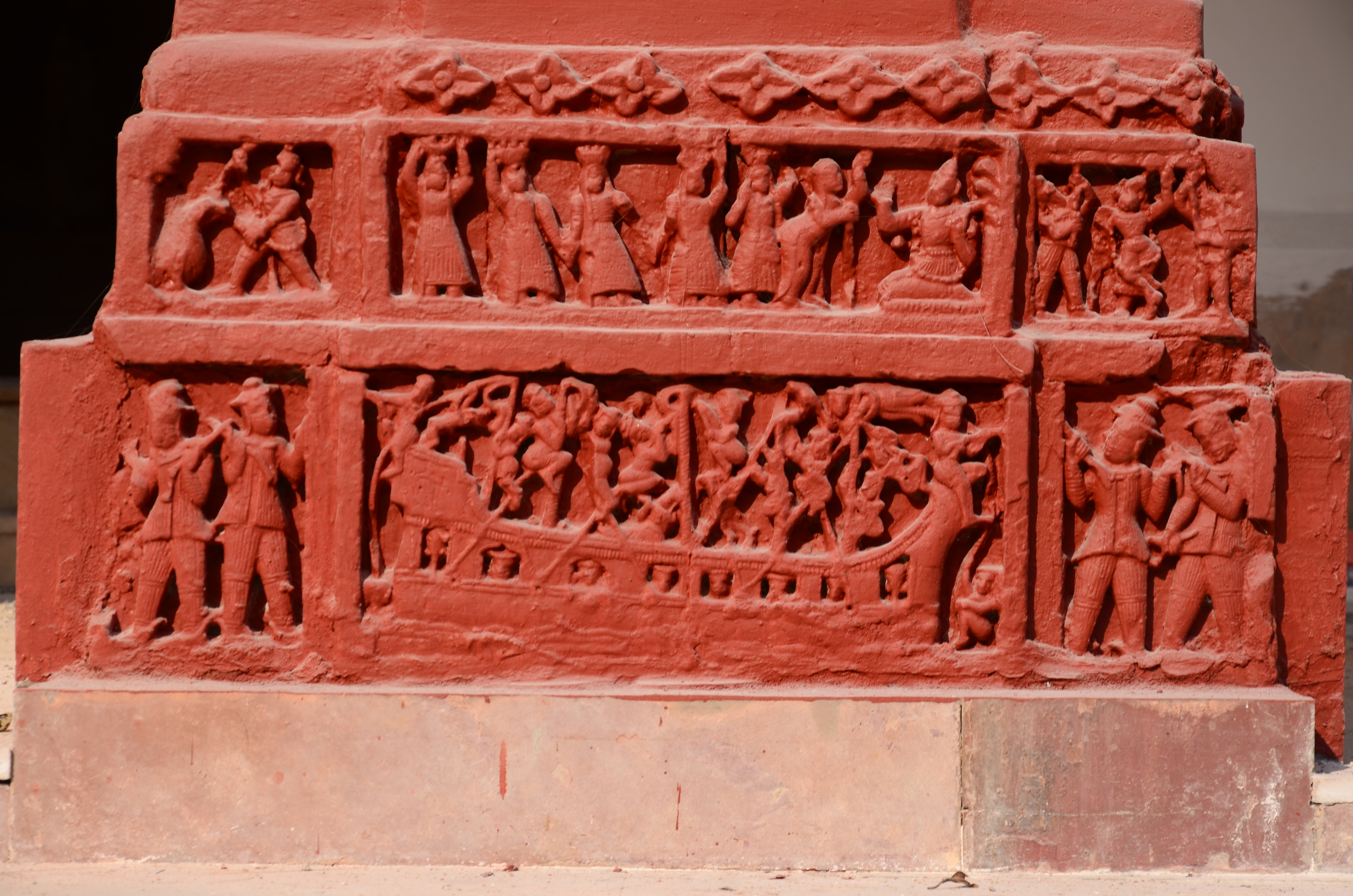
Terracotta relief

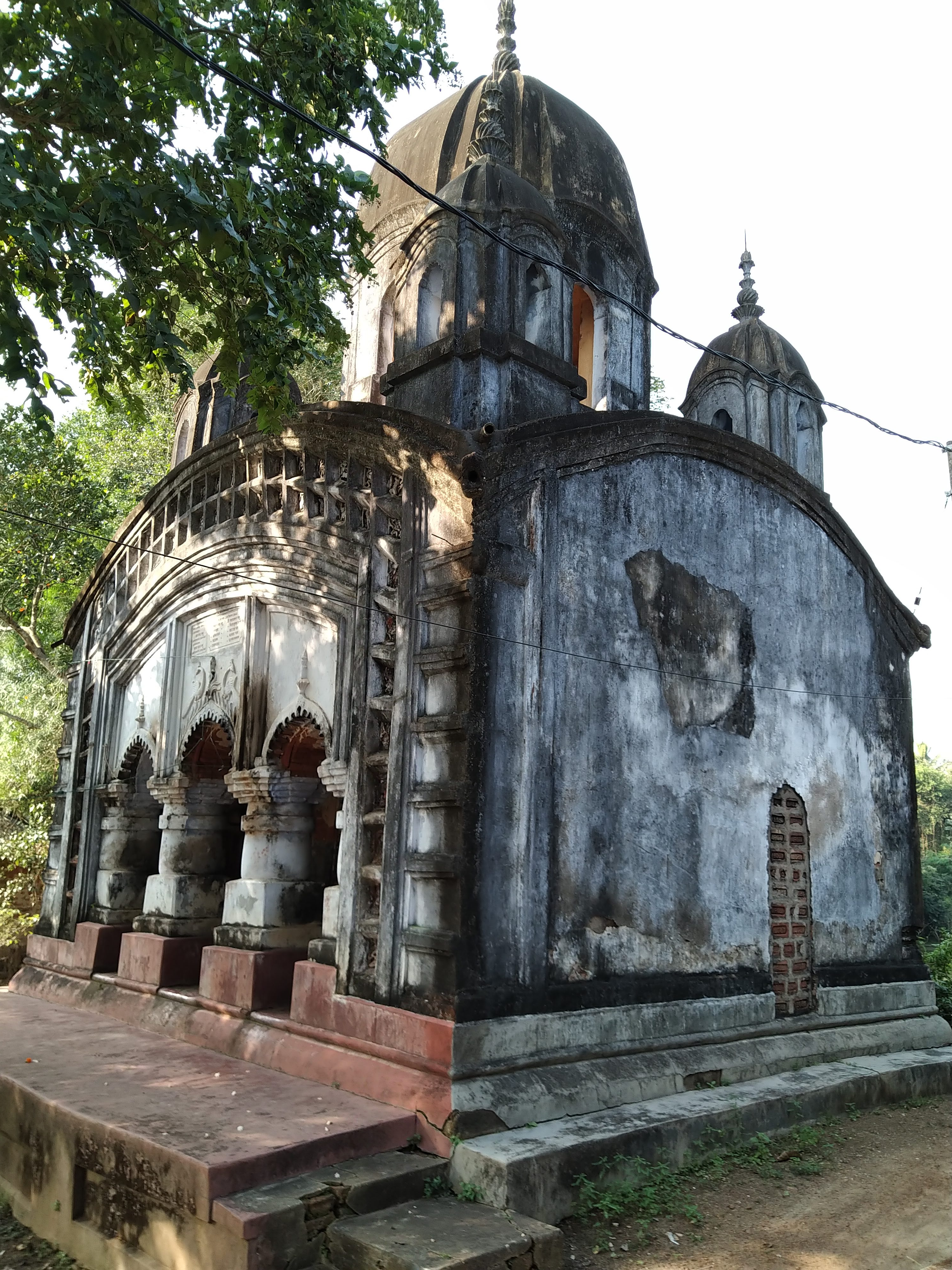
Pancha-ratna Dadhi Bamna temple, established in 1770 and owned by the Bose family.

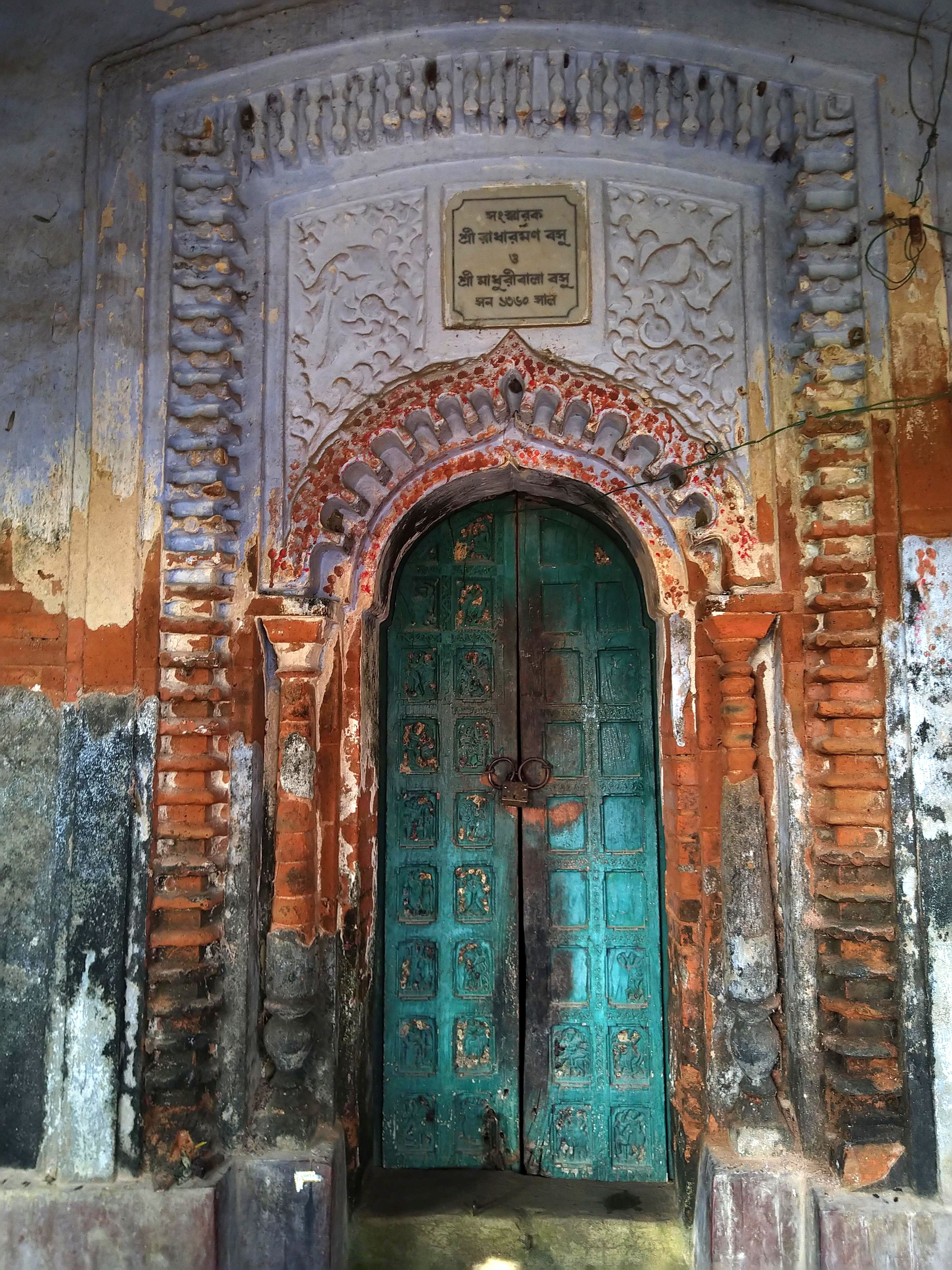
Not much terracotta remains in the Dadhi Bamna temple. This picture shows some stucco decoration.
