= Mamata Bhunia =

Indian politician

Member of the West Bengal Legislative Assembly
- In office 12 June 2012 – 5 May 2026
- Preceded by: Ajit Bhunia
- Succeeded by: Tapan Kumar Dutta
- Constituency: Daspur

Personal details
- Party: AITC
- Profession: Politician

Mamata Bhunia is an Indian politician member of All India Trinamool Congress. She is an MLA, elected from the Daspur constituency in the 2016 West Bengal state assembly election. In 2021 assembly election she was re-elected from the same constituency.
