= Tapan Kumar Dutta =

Indian politician (born 1962)

Member of the West Bengal Legislative Assembly
- Incumbent
- Assumed office 4 May 2026
- Preceded by: Mamata Bhunia
- Constituency: Daspur

Personal details
- Party: Bharatiya Janata Party
- Profession: Politician

Tapan Kumar Dutta (born 1962) is an Indian politician from West Bengal. He is a member of the West Bengal Legislative Assembly from the Daspur Assembly constituency in Paschim Medinipur district representing the Bharatiya Janata Party.

== Early life and education ==
Dutta is from Daspur, Paschim Medinipur district, West Bengal. He is the son of the late Bimala Charan Dutta. He studied up to Class 12 and passed the Higher Secondary examinations conducted by the National Institute of Open Schooling. He works as an LIC agent. He declared assets worth Rs.2 crore in his affidavit to the Election Commission of India.

== Career ==
Dutta won the Daspur Assembly constituency representing the Bharatiya Janata Party in the 2026 West Bengal Legislative Assembly election. He polled 1,33,071 votes and defeated his nearest rival, Ashis Hudait of the All India Trinamool Congress, by a margin of 32,134 votes.
