= National Institute of Open Schooling =

School education board in India

National Institute of Open Schooling (NIOS)
- राष्ट्रीय मुक्त विद्यालयी शिक्षा संस्थान
- Official seal of the NIOS Board
- Abbreviation: NIOS
- Formation: 12 November 1989; 36 years ago
- Founder: Government of India
- Type: National, Open Schooling
- Legal status: Active
- Headquarters: Noida, Uttar Pradesh
- Official language: Hindi; Indian English
- Chairman: Akhilesh Mishra
- Director: Rajiv Kumar Singh
- Parent organisation: Department of School Education and Literacy
- Students: 112,000+ (2024)
- Website: nios.ac.in
- Formerly called: National Open School

The National Institute of Open Schooling (NIOS) is a national level board of education in India, controlled and managed by the Government of India. It was established by the Department of School Education and Literacy in 1989.

The NIOS operates through a network of five departments, 23 regional centres, two sub-regional centres, two NIOS cells, and more than 7,400 study centres (AIs/AVIs) across India and abroad. It is recognized as the largest open schooling system in the world, with a cumulative enrolment of over 41.3 lakh learners during the last five years.

Between 2004 and 2009, NIOS recorded a cumulative enrolment of about 1.5 million students at the secondary and senior secondary levels, and it continues to enrol around 350,000 learners annually. NIOS functions as an autonomous organisation under the Union of India, Department of School Education and Literacy, similar in status to other national educational boards such as the Central Board of Secondary Education (CBSE).

== International collaboration and overseas centres ==
The NIOS collaborates with the Commonwealth of Learning (COL) and UNESCO. It also has study centres for Indian expatriates in Bahrain, the United Arab Emirates, Oman, Kuwait, Nepal, Canada, Kingdom of Saudi Arabia, Australia, United Kingdom, New Zealand, Malaysia, Singapore and the United States of America.

== Courses offered ==
NIOS offer the following courses:

- Open Basic Education (OBE) Programme for 14+ years age group (adolescents and adults) that are equivalent to classes of the formal school system
  - Level A - Equivalent to Class III
  - Level B - Equivalent to Class V
  - Level C - Equivalent to Class VIII
  - Secondary Course—Equivalent to class X
  - Senior Secondary Course—Equivalent to class XII
- Vocational Education Courses
- Life enrichment programmes
- D.EL.ED. course
- Secondary and Senior Secondary Courses for students at the Industrial Training Institute
- Indian Sign Language as a subject at the Secondary Level for Children with Hearing Impairment (Deafness), since 2021.

== Examinations ==
The public examinations are held twice a year in April–May and October–November on dates fixed by the NIOS. However, one is also eligible (If he/she is registered under Stream 1,3 and 4) to appear through the On-Demand Examinations at Secondary (10th) and Senior Secondary (12th). On Demand Exams are held through the year except for April–May and Oct–Nov i.e. when public exams are going on, ODE isn't held.

Results of the public examinations and on demand are usually announced seven weeks after the last date of examinations.

== Organisation and administration ==
The NIOS is organised as an autonomous education board under the Department of School Education and Literacy (DSEL). The organisation is overseen by an Executive Board including staff from the DSEL, Directors responsible for sectors of the NIOS mission (Academic, Vocational, Student Support Services and Evaluation), as well as a Secretary and Chairman. The current Chairman is Dr. Akhilesh Mishra.

Programmes are delivered through a network of centres across India, including:

- regional centres in Allahabad, Bhopal, Chandigarh, Delhi, Guwahati, Hyderabad, Jaipur, Kolkata, Kochi, Patna, Pune, Dehradun, Bhubaneswar, Bengaluru, Gandhinagar, Raipur, Chennai, Ranchi, Dharamshala, Visakhapatnam, Sikkim, Amethi.
- sub-regional centres in Darbhanga and Kota
- 3,530 Accredited Institutions (AIs) for academic courses
- 1,379 Accredited Vocational Institutions (AVIs) for vocational education courses
- 1,313 Accredited Agencies (AAs) for Open Basic Education

== Notable alumni ==
- Armaan Ebrahim – Indian car racer
- Dipika Pallikal – Indian squash player
- Gayatri Gopichand – Indian badminton player
- Jai Quehaeni – Indian actress and dancer
- Kavya Madhavan – Indian actress
- L. Athira Krishna – Indian violinist
- Leema Babu – Indian actress
- Mary Kom – Indian Olympic boxer
- Pullela Gopichand – Indian badminton player
- Somdev Devvarman – Indian tennis player
- Tapan Kumar Dutta – Indian politician
- Varun Thakkar – Indian sailor

== See also ==
- Indira Gandhi National Open University (IGNOU)
- Board of High School and Intermediate Education Uttar Pradesh (UP Board), India
- Central Board of Secondary Education (CBSE), India
- Council for the Indian School Certificate Examinations (CISCE), India (ICSE and ISC examinations are conducted by CISCE)
- Indian School Certificate (ISC), India
- Indian Certificate of Secondary Education (ICSE), India
- Secondary School Leaving Certificate (SSLC)
- West Bengal Board of Secondary Education (WBBSE), India
- Board of Secondary Education, Madhya Pradesh (MPBSE), India
- Maharashtra State Board of Secondary and Higher Secondary Education (MSBSHSE), India
