= Daspur I =

Daspur - I
- Community development block
- Coordinates: 22.605°N 87.722°E
- Country: India
- State: West Bengal
- District: Paschim Medinipur

Government
  - Type: Federal democracy

Area
  - Total: 168.30 km^{2} (64.98 sq mi)
- Elevation: 9 m (30 ft)

Population (2011)
  - Total: 203,987
  - Density: 1,212.0/km^{2} (3,139.2/sq mi)

Languages
  - Official: Bengali, English
- Time zone: UTC+5:30 (IST)
- Area code: 03225
- ISO 3166 code: IN-WB
- Vehicle registration: WB-34
- Literacy: 83.99%
- Lok Sabha constituency: Ghatal
- Vidhan Sabha constituency: Daspur, Ghatal
- Website: paschimmedinipur.gov.in

Daspur I is a community development block that forms an administrative division in Ghatal subdivision of Paschim Medinipur district in the Indian state of West Bengal.

== Geography ==
In Daspur I CD block, the area is a flat deltaic country intersected by numerous rivers and water courses. It is a flood prone area and is affected by water logging in the rainy season. 100% of the cultivated area has highly productive alluvial soil.

Daspur is located at 22°36′18″N 87°43′19″E.

Daspur I CD block is bounded by Ghatal CD block in the north, Daspur II CD block in the east, Panskura I CD block, in Purba Medinipur district, in the south and Keshpur CD block in the west.

It is located 52 km from Midnapore, the district headquarters.

Daspur I CD block has an area of 168.30 km^{2}. It has 1 panchayat samity, 10 gram panchayats, 161 gram sansads (village councils), 162 mouzas and 157 inhabited villages. Daspur police station serves this block. Headquarters of this CD block is at Daspur.

Gram panchayats of Daspur I block/ panchayat samiti are: Basudevpur, Daspur I, Daspur II, Nandanpur I, Nandanpur II, Nij-Narajole, Panchberia, Rajnagar, Sarberia I and Sarberia II.

== Demographics ==
=== Population ===
According to the 2011 Census of India Daspur I CD block had a total population of 203,987, all of which were rural. There were 103,757 (51%) males and 100,230 (49%) females. Population in the age range 0–6 years was 22,797. Scheduled Castes numbered 49,651 (24.34%) and Scheduled Tribes numbered 5,695 (2.79%).

As per 2001 census, Daspur I block had a total population of 175,331, out of which 86,872 were males and 88,459 were females. Daspur I block registered a population growth of 10.60 per cent during the 1991-2001 decade. Decadal growth for the combined Midnapore district was 14.87 per cent. Decadal growth in West Bengal was 17.45 per cent.

Large villages (with 4,000+ population) in Daspur I CD block are (2011 census figures in brackets): Nij Narajol (4,085) and Rajnagar (4,890).

Other villages in Daspur I CD block include (2011 census figures in brackets): Daspur (3,667), Panchberya (2,164), Sarberya (1,058), Nandanpur (810), Basudebpur (3,160), Laoda (1,328), Dihi Baliharpur (867), Shaulan (964), Radhakantapur (2,473), Gobindanagar (2,083), Kotalpur (1,342) and Sarberya (1,058).

=== Literacy ===
As per the 2011 census the total number of literate persons in Daspur I CD block was 152,189 (83.99% of the population over 6 years) out of which males numbered 83,778 (90.87% of the male population over 6 years) and females numbered 68,411 (76.87% of the female population over 6 years). The gender gap in literacy rates was 13.99%.

As per the 2011 census, literacy in Paschim Medinipur district was 78.00%. Literacy in West Bengal was 77.08% in 2011. Literacy in India in 2011 was 74.04%.

See also – List of West Bengal districts ranked by literacy rate

Literacy in CD blocks of
Paschim Medinipur district
Jhargram subdivision
Binpur I – 69.74%
Binpur II – 70.46%
Gopiballavpur I – 65.44%
Gopiballavpur II – 71.40%
Jamboni – 72.63%
Jhargram – 72.23%
Nayagram – 63.70%
Sankrail – 73.35%
Medinipur Sadar subdivision
Garhbeta I – 72.21%
Garhbeta II – 75.87%
Garhbeta III – 73.42%
Keshpur – 77.88%
Midnapore Sadar – 70.48%
Salboni – 74.87%
Ghatal subdivision
Chandrakona I – 78.93%
Chandrakona II – 75.96%
Daspur I – 83.99%
Daspur II – 85.62%
Ghatal – 81.08%
Kharagpur subdivision
Dantan I – 73.53%
Dantan II – 82.45%
Debra – 82.03%
Keshiari – 76.78%
Kharagpur I – 77.06%
Kharagpur II – 76.08%
Mohanpur – 80.51%
Narayangarh – 78.31%
Pingla – 83.57%
Sabang – 86.84%
2011 Census: CD Block Wise

Primary Census Abstract Data

=== Language and religion ===
Religion in Daspur I CD block (2011)
Hinduism	93.88%
Islam	5.97%
Other or not stated	0.15%

In the 2011 census Hindus numbered 191,501 and formed 93.88% of the population in Daspur I CD block. Muslims numbered 12,171 and formed 5.97% of the population. Others numbered 315 and formed 0.15% of the population. Others include Addi Bassi, Marang Boro, Santal, Saranath, Sari Dharma, Sarna, Alchchi, Bidin, Sant, Saevdharm, Seran, Saran, Sarin, Kheria, Christians and other religious communities. In 2001, Hindus were 94.01% and Muslims 5.91% of the population respectively.

Languages of Daspur I CD block (2011)
1. Bengali (98.5%)
2. Santali (1.17%)
3. Others (0.31%)

At the time of the 2011 census, 98.52% of the population spoke Bengali and 1.17% Santali as their first language.

== BPL families ==
In Daspur I CD block 22.16% families were living below poverty line in 2007.

According to the District Human Development Report of Paschim Medinipur: The 29 CD blocks of the district were classified into four categories based on the poverty ratio. Nayagram, Binpur II and Jamboni CD blocks have very high poverty levels (above 60%). Kharagpur I, Kharagpur II, Sankrail, Garhbeta II, Pingla and Mohanpur CD blocks have high levels of poverty (50-60%), Jhargram, Midnapore Sadar, Dantan I, Gopiballavpur II, Binpur I, Dantan II, Keshiari, Chandrakona I, Gopiballavpur I, Chandrakona II, Narayangarh, Keshpur, Ghatal, Sabang, Garhbeta I, Salboni, Debra and Garhbeta III CD blocks have moderate levels of poverty (25-50%) and Daspur II and Daspur I CD blocks have low levels of poverty (below 25%).

== Economy ==
=== Infrastructure ===
156 or 96% of mouzas in Daspur I CD block were electrified by 31 March 2014.

162 mouzas in Daspur I CD block had drinking water facilities in 2013–14. There were 137 fertiliser depots, 130 seed stores and 40 fair price shops in the CD block.

=== Agriculture ===
Persons engaged in agriculture
in Daspur I CD block
1. Bargadars (7.74%)
2. Patta holders (10.4%)
3. Small farmers (3.33%)
4. Marginal farmers (37.8%)
5. Agricultural labourers (40.7%)

Although the Bargadari Act of 1950 recognised the rights of bargadars to a higher share of crops from the land that they tilled, it was not fully implemented. Large tracts, beyond the prescribed limit of land ceiling, remained with the rich landlords. From 1977 onwards major land reforms took place in West Bengal. Land in excess of land ceiling was acquired and distributed amongst the peasants. Following land reforms land ownership pattern has undergone transformation. In 2013–14, persons engaged in agriculture in Daspur I CD block could be classified as follows: bargadars 7.74%, patta (document) holders 10.40%, small farmers (possessing land between 1 and 2 hectares) 3.33%, marginal farmers (possessing land up to 1 hectare) 37.84% and agricultural labourers 40.69%.

In 2005-06 the nett cropped area in Daspur I CD block was 13,200 hectares, out of a geographical area of 16,719 hectares, and the area in which more than one crop was grown was 12,826 hectares.

The extension of irrigation has played a role in growth of the predominantly agricultural economy. In 2013–14, the total area irrigated in Daspur I CD block was 8,940 hectares, out of which 220 hectares were irrigated by tank water, 4,980 hectares by deep tubewells, 10 hectares by shallow tubewells, 780 hectares by river lift irrigation and 2,950 hectares by other methods.

In 2013–14, Daspur I CD block produced 1,022 tonnes of Aman paddy, the main winter crop, from 2,219 hectares, 1,239 tonnes of Aus paddy (summer crop) from 535 hectares, 25,927 tonnes of Boro paddy (spring crop) from 8,335 hectares, 6,423 tonnes of jute from 511 hectares and 37,180 tonnes of potatoes from 1,893 hectares. It also produced oilseeds.

=== Banking ===
In 2013–14, Daspur I CD block had offices of 9 commercial banks and 1 gramin bank.

== Transport ==
Daspur I CD block has 17 ferry services and 4 originating/ terminating bus routes. The nearest railway station is 30 km from the CD block headquarters.

== Education ==
In 2013–14, Daspur I CD block had 129 primary schools with 11,222 students, 5 middle schools with 324 students, 15 high schools with 6,370 students and 14 higher secondary schools with 15,171 students. Daspur I CD block had 1 general college with 626 students, 2 technical/ professional institutions with 221 students, 327 institutions for special and non-formal education with 12,111 students.

The United Nations Development Programme considers the combined primary and secondary enrolment ratio as the simple indicator of educational achievement of the children in the school going age. The infrastructure available is important. In Daspur I CD block out of the total 129 primary schools in 2008–2009, 48 had pucca buildings, 45 partially pucca and 36 multiple type.

Narajole Raj College at Narajole was established in 1966 and is affiliated to Vidyasagar University. It offers undergraduate courses in science and arts. It has started a post-graduate course in Bengali.

== Culture ==
The Daspur I CD block has several heritage temples and the historically famous Narajole Rajbari.

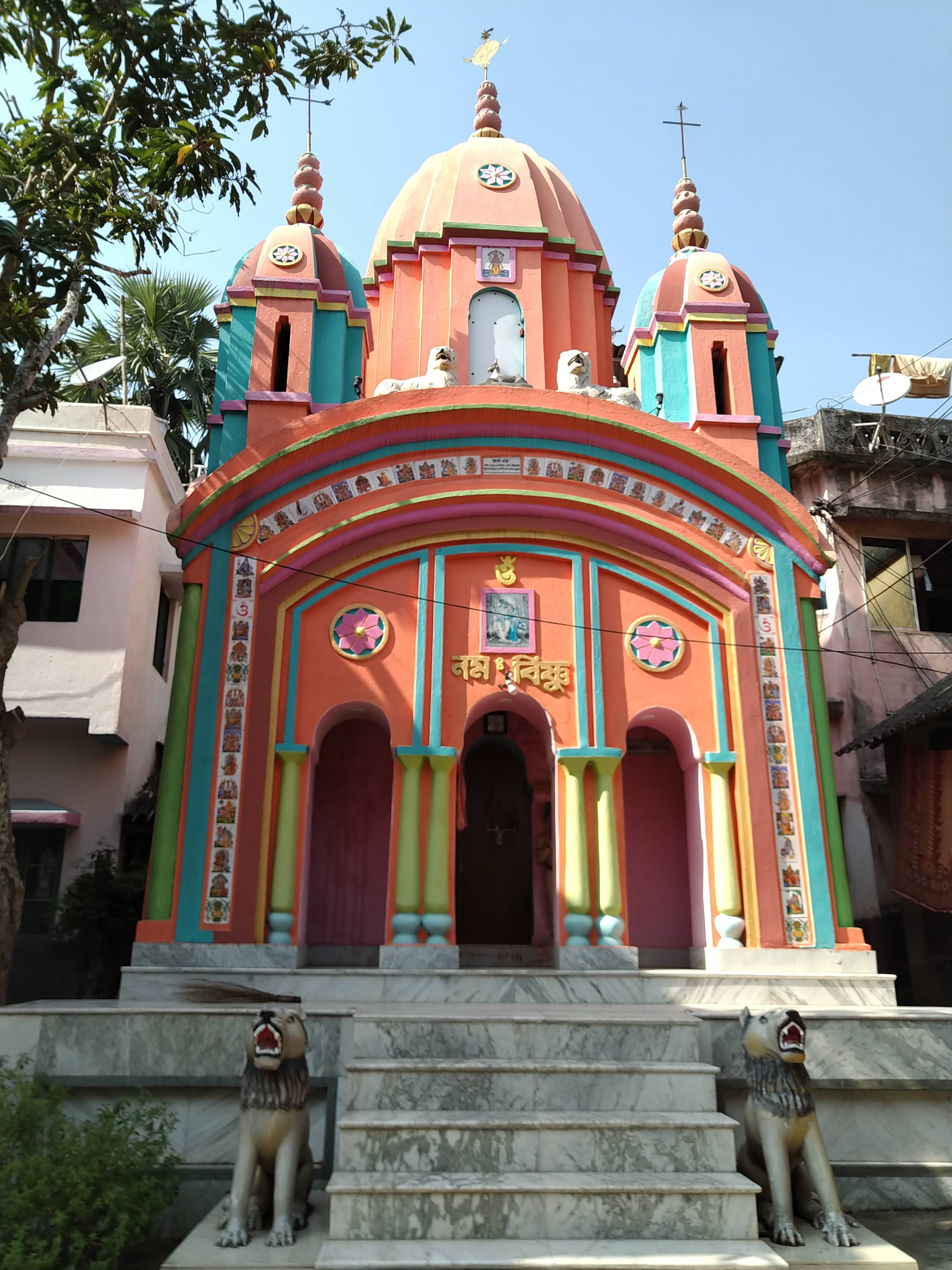
Kotalpur: Pancha ratna Sridharjiu temple built in 1813, enovated.

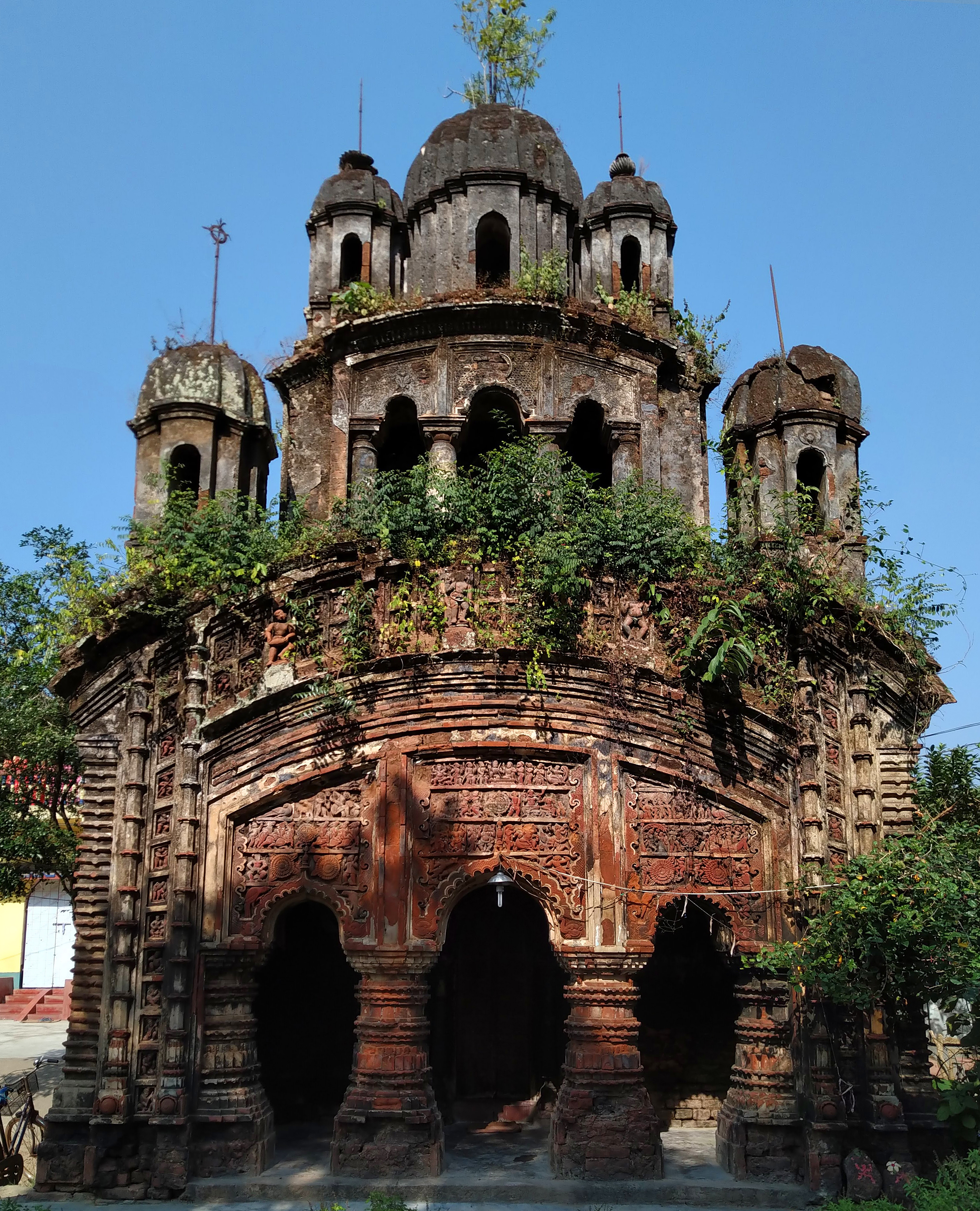
Laoda: Nava ratna Banka Rai temple (in picture), built in 1810, with terracotta plaques, and pancha ratna Raghunath temple in a ruinous state.

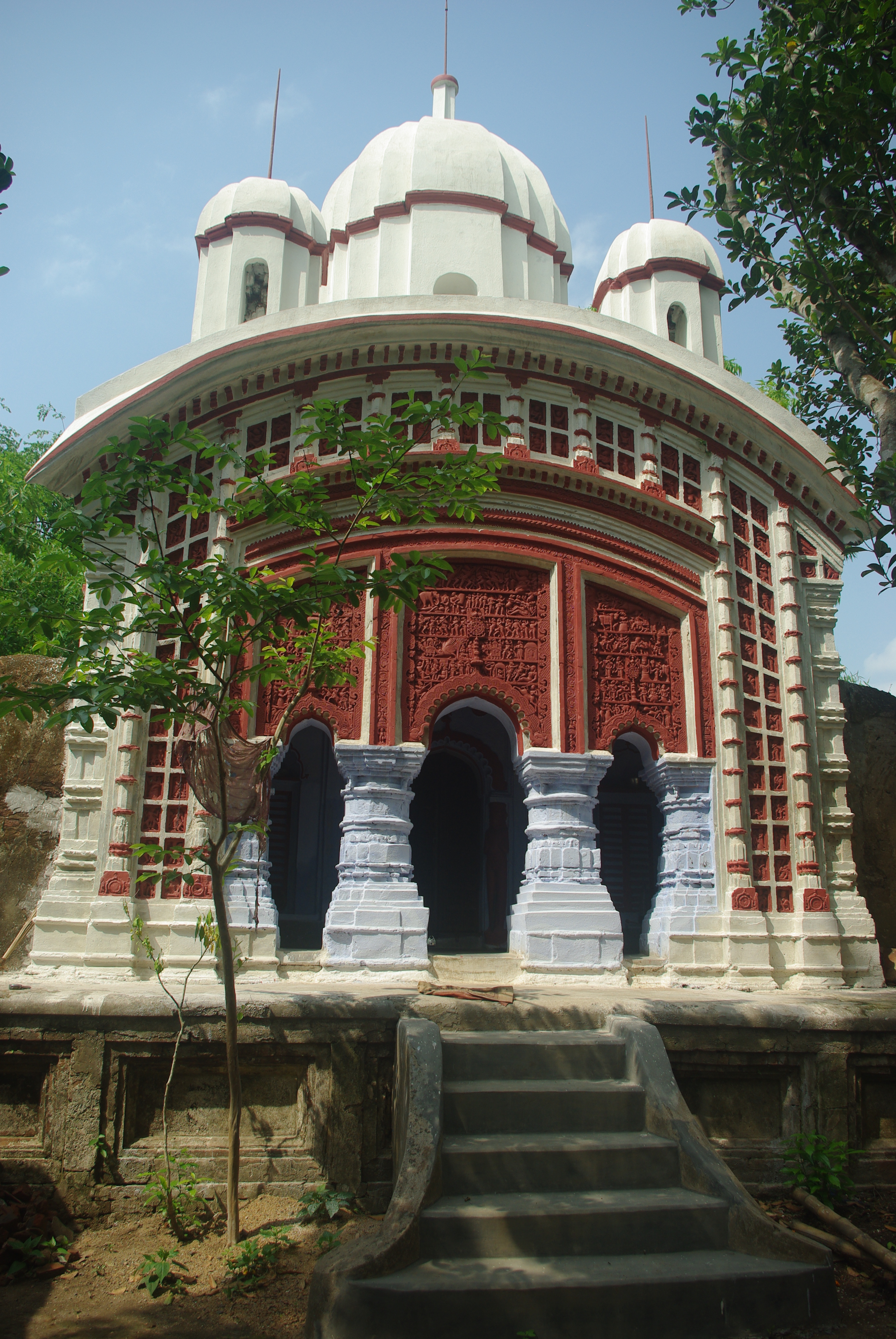
Daspur: Pancha ratna Lakshmi Janardana temple (in picture) built in 1791, with rich terracotta decoration, renovated, and Ek ratna Gopinath temple, built in 1716, with rich terracotta work, state protected monument.

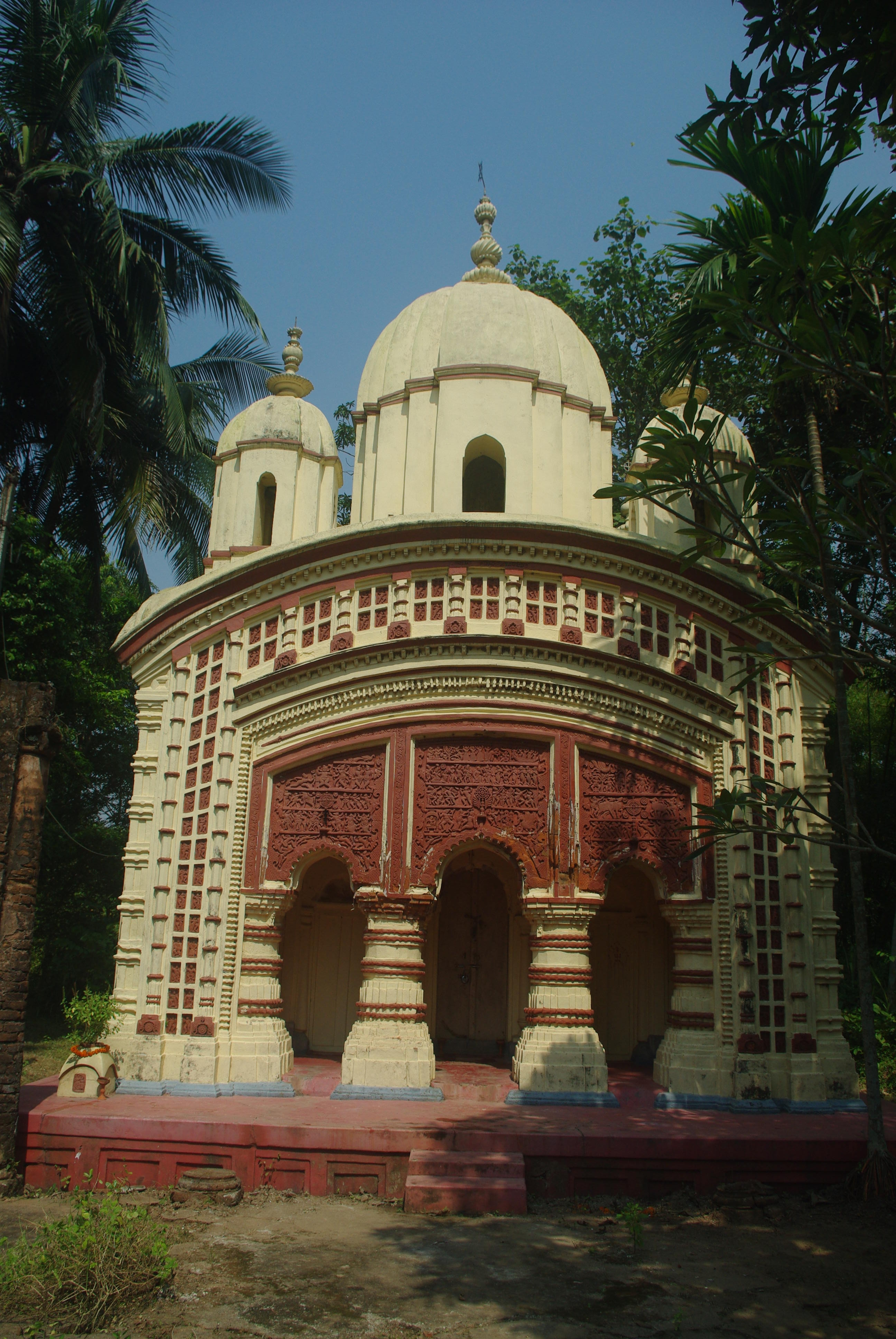
Dihi Baliharpur: Pancha ratna Radha Govinda temple, built in 1798, façade with rich terracotta panels, renovated.

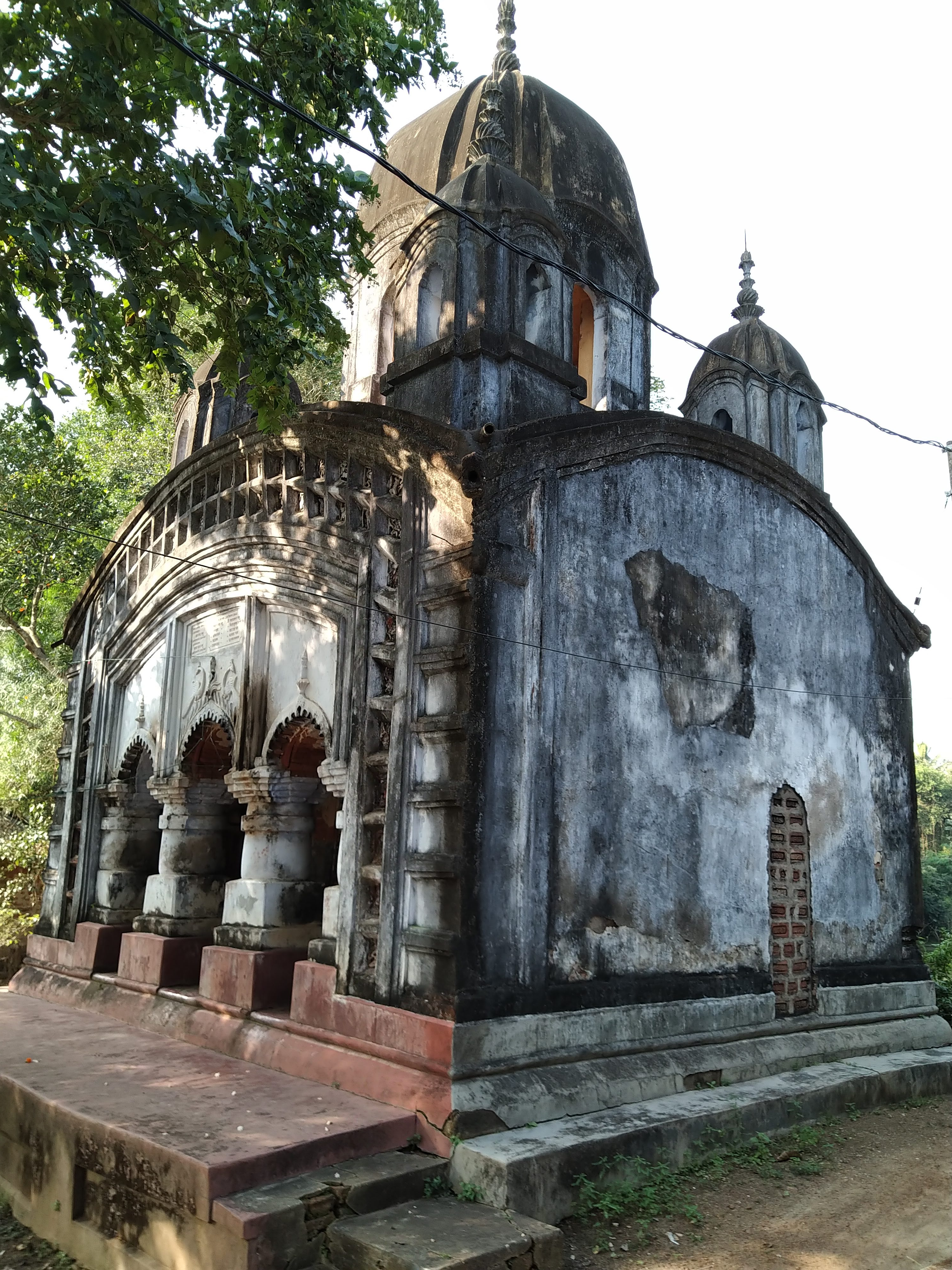
Radhakantapur: Pancha ratna Dadhi Bamna temple (in picture), built in 1770, not much terracotta decoration left, some stucco work, and Ek ratna Gopinath temple, with rich terracotta façade, built in 1884, renovated.

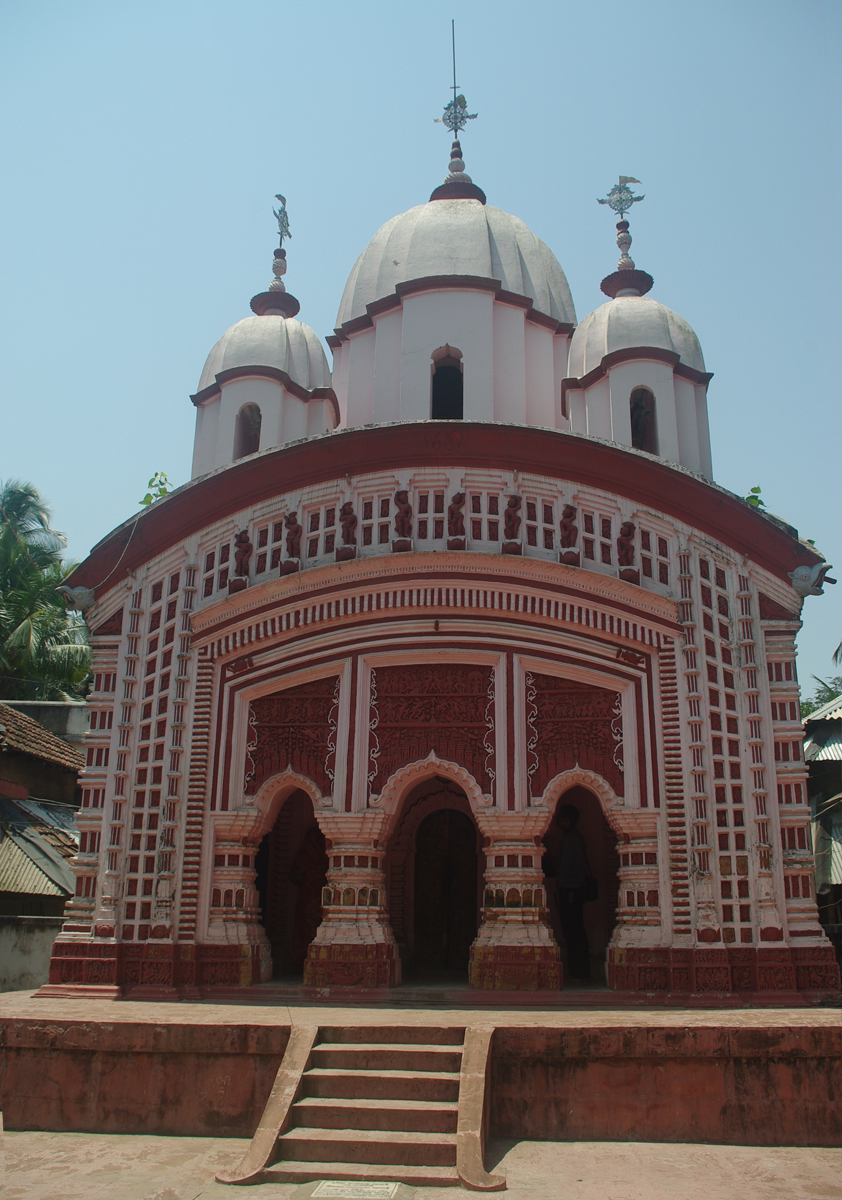
Gobindanagar: Pancha ratna Radha Govinda temple, built in 1682, much renovated, state protected monument.

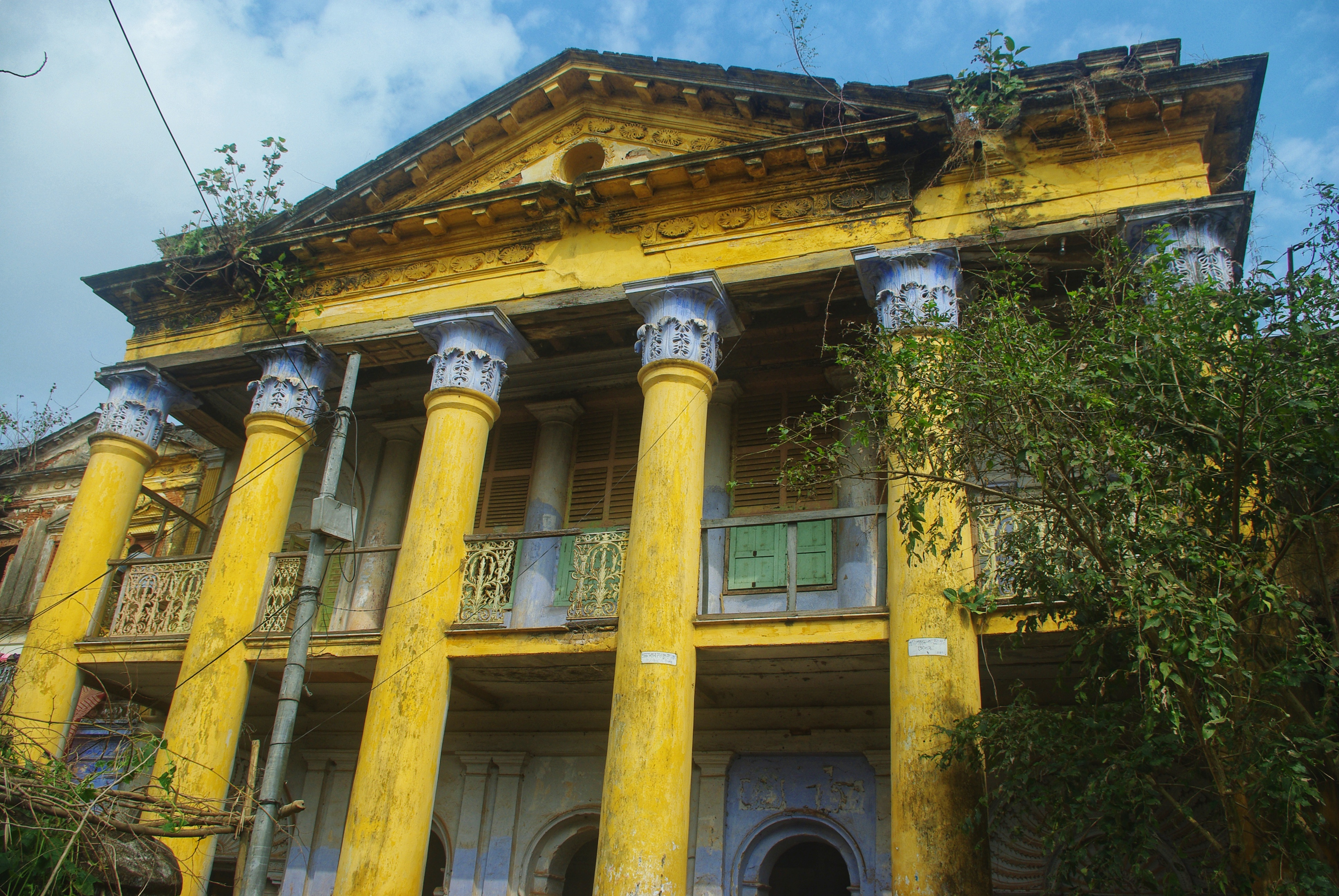
Narajole Rajbari

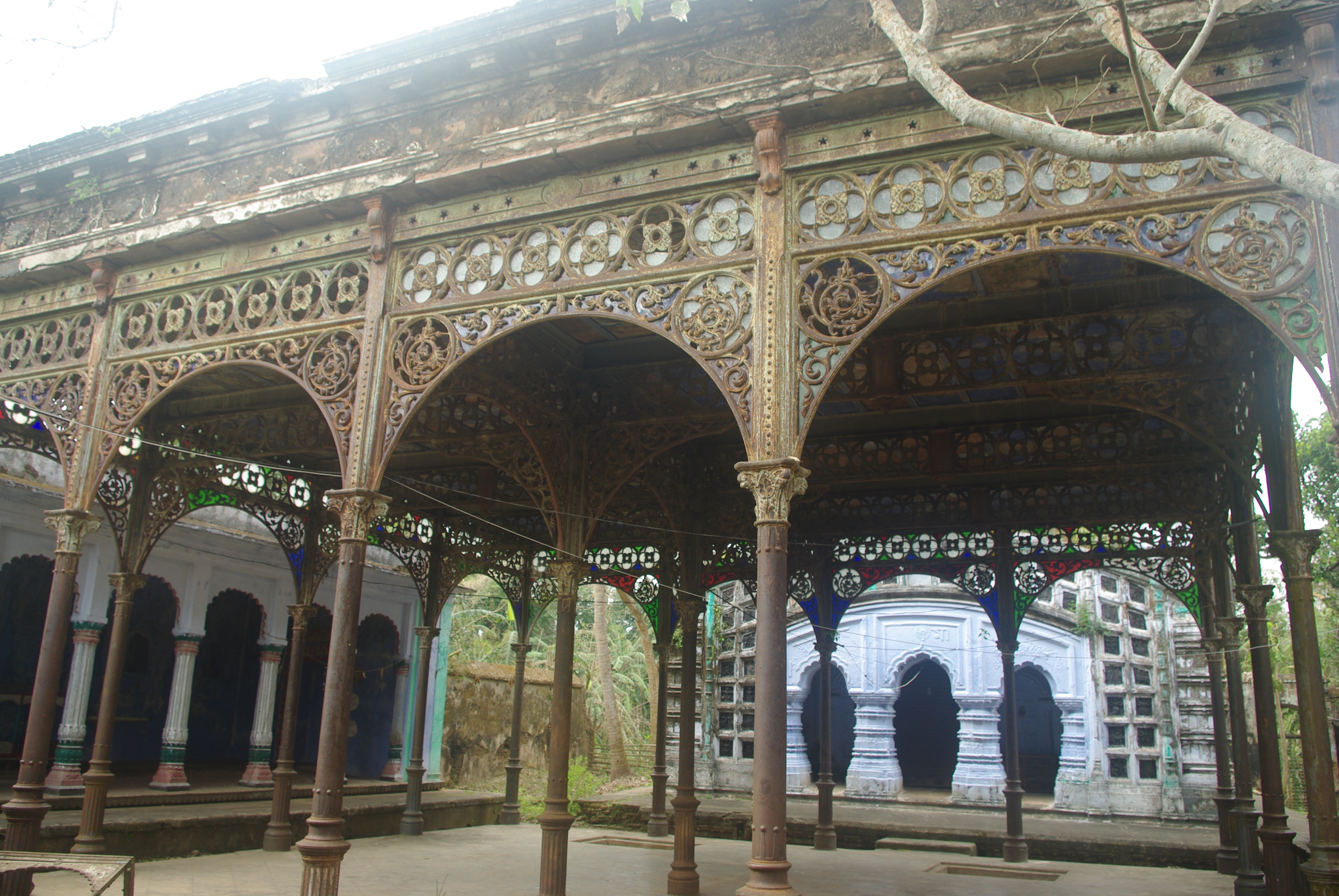
Narajole Rajbari Durga Dalan

== Healthcare ==
In 2014, Daspur I CD block had 1 rural hospital, 2 primary health centres and 8 private nursing homes with total 76 beds and 11 doctors. It had 31 family welfare sub centres and 1 family welfare centre. 2,100 patients were treated indoor and 107,659 patients were treated outdoor in the hospitals, health centres and subcentres of the CD Block.

Daspur Rural Hospital, with 30 beds at Daspur is the major government medical facility in the Daspur I CD block. There are primary health centres at: Makrampur (PO Choto Makrampur) (with 4 beds), Narajole (with 10 beds) and Sekenday (with 2 beds).
