= David McCutchion =

British academic (1930–1972)

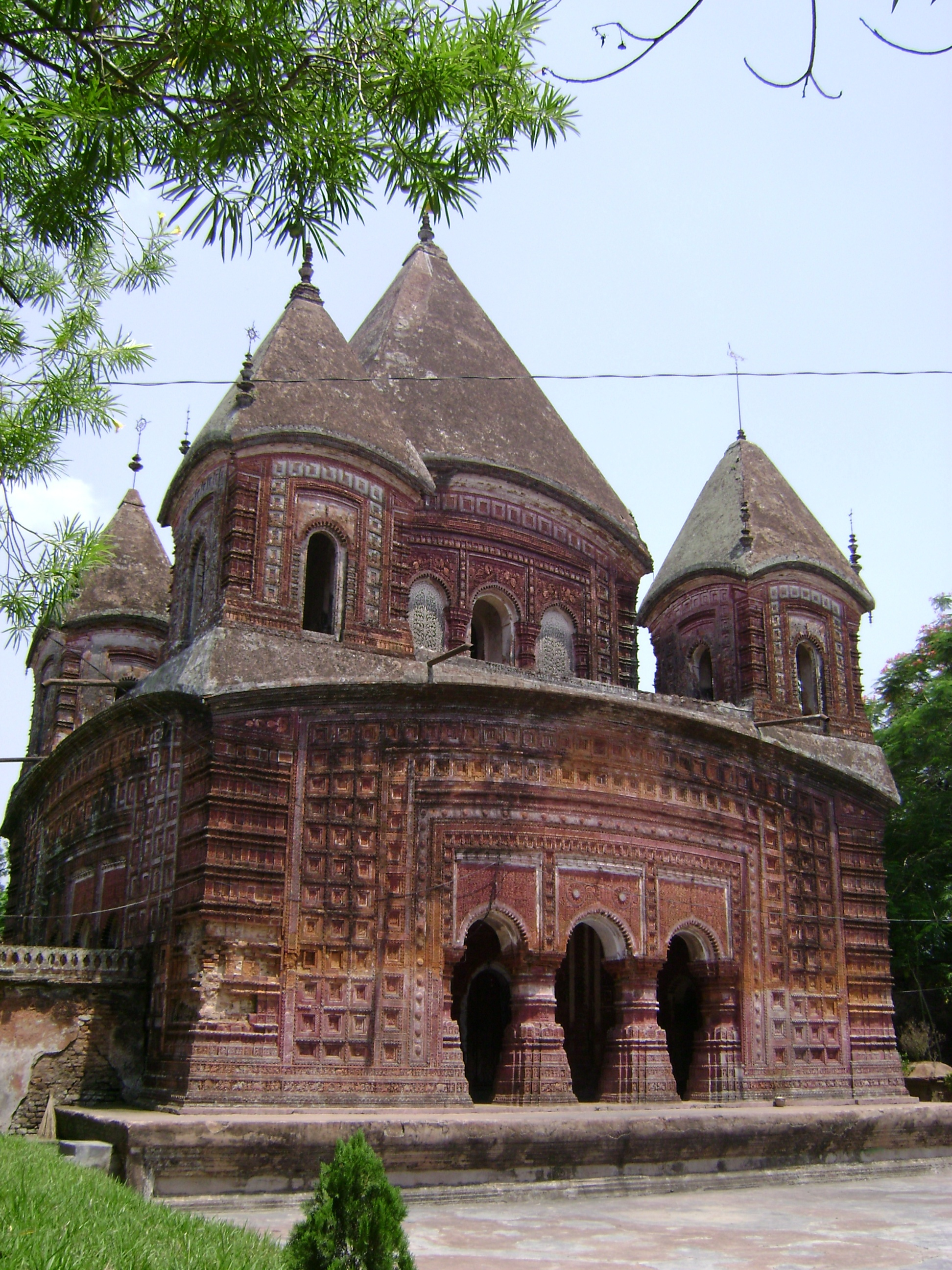
Bengali Terracotta Architecture (The Pancharatna Gobinda Temple)

David McCutchion (12 August 1930 – 12 January 1972) was an English-born academic, and a pioneer in a number of original strands of scholarship in Indian studies before his early death at age 41. Popularly known as "Davidbabu", in his short life, he made a major contribution to the study of Hindu terracotta and brick temples of Bengal and was also one of the first scholars to write a study of the emerging field of Indian writing in English.

== Early life ==
McCutchion was born in Coventry, England, and attended the red brick-built King Henry VIII Grammar School. While there it was bombed in a German raid and he was evacuated for a time. After the war he spent a year on national service in Singapore with the R.A.F. He went up to Jesus College, Cambridge, in 1950 to read Modern Languages (French and German). An interest in the East was whetted by his time in Malaya, and after a period teaching in schools in southern France, he decided to travel out to India.

== An academic in Bengal ==
In Jesus College his interest in the East had led to him being a keen member of the Tagore Society, a factor which must have drawn him to Bengal. He went out initially on a temporary six-month contract to teach English at Tagore's Visva-Bharati University, Santiniketan. Thereafter in Calcutta he mixed with a circle of Indians writing in English around Purusottama Lal's Writers Workshop, a publishing house that went on to publish many of his works, some posthumously. As an academic McCutchion also took this phenomenon as his field. He became Professor, then Reader, in Comparative Literature at Jadavpur University in Calcutta after 1960, where he taught eighteenth-century French and English literature, and developed the critical theme of Indian writing in English, starting with an essay of 1962: The Novel as Sastra, a study of Raja Rao.

== Terracotta temples ==
Around 1960 McCutchion met and developed an important friendship with Satyajit Ray based on a relaxed rapport. They both shared a taste for western baroque music. Ray asked him to help translate his film dialogue from Bengali into English, a task that helped inversely to increase McCutchion's command of Bengali. It was while on shooting location in Birbhum district for Abhijan in 1962, that McCutchion developed a fascination for the brick temples scattered across the Bengal landscape. Over the next decade they became a passion; of categorising, conservation and documentation, driving his use of photography as a recording device. His photographic collection amounting to some 20,000 images (colour slides and b/w prints) was acquired by the V & A with copies held by the 'International Centre for Study of Bengal Art (ICSBA)'. He also studied and collected the Bengali patua art, or scroll paintings of traditional artists, which developed out of the religious art surrounding the temples. This collection was later bequeathed to the Herbert Art Gallery in Coventry.

== Early death ==
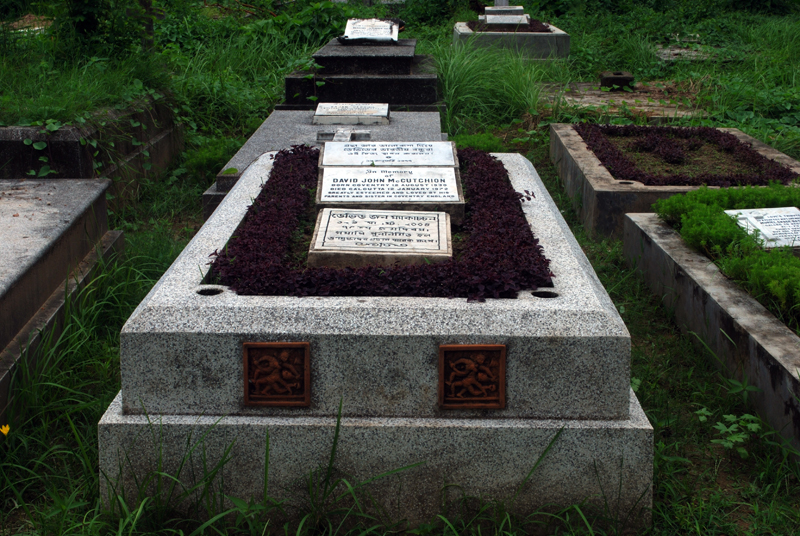
David McCutchion's Grave, Bhawanipore Cemetery, Kolkata

It was the arduous demands and hazards of tramping the Indian countryside that brought about his early and sudden death, a result of polio, in January 1972. A token of the affection he was held by those in Calcutta that knew him is evident in the tribute volume of recollections, David McCutchion: Shraddhanjali, and his correspondence with Purusottama Lal published soon after his death. In his last year McCutchion was a visiting lecturer at the University of Sussex where he introduced aspects of Indian culture to the student body through evening lectures and with visiting speakers, exhibitions, and film screenings. He is buried in the Bhawanipore Cemetery in Alipore and his grave lies in neglect.

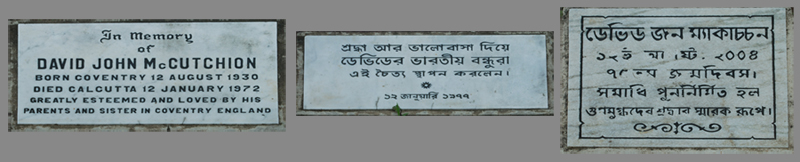
Epitaphs in David McCutchion's Grave

== Selected bibliography ==
- The Temples of Bankura District (Calcutta, Writers Workshop [c1967])
- Indian Writing in English: Critical Essays (Calcutta: Writers Workshop, 1969)
- Late Mediaeval Temples of Bengal: Origins and Classification (Calcutta: The Asiatic Society, 1972)
- The epistles of David-Kaka to Plalm’n [1960-1971]: the record of a friendship (Calcutta: Writers Workshop, 1972)
- Brick Temples of Bengal: From the Archives of David McCutchion, (Princeton, N.J.: Princeton University Press, 1983), his research collected, interpreted and published by George Michell.
- Patuas and Patua Art in Bengal by David McCutchion and Suhrid K. Bhowmik, (Calcutta : Firma KLM, 1999).
- Unpublished Letters & Selected Articles by David J. McCutchion, (Calcutta : Monfakira Books, 2009).
