= Daspur Assembly constituency =

Daspur
- Constituency No. 230 for the West Bengal Legislative Assembly
- Interactive Map Outlining Daspur Assembly Constituency

Constituency details
- Country: India
- Region: East India
- State: West Bengal
- District: Paschim Medinipur
- Lok Sabha constituency: Ghatal
- Established: 1951
- Total electors: 242,252
- Reservation: None

Member of Legislative Assembly
- 18th West Bengal Legislative Assembly
- Incumbent Tapan Kumar Dutta
- Party: BJP
- Elected year: 2026
- Preceded by: Mamata Bhunia

Most Successful Parties from Daspur Assembly
1. Communist Party of India (Marxist) (8 times) (42.1%)
2. All India Trinamool Congress (5 time) (26.3%)
3. Communist Party of India (3 times) (15.8%)
4. Indian National Congress (2 times) (10.5%)
5. Bharatiya Janata Party (1 time) (5.26%)

Daspur Assembly constituency is an assembly constituency in the Paschim Medinipur district in the Indian state of West Bengal.

== Overview ==
As per the orders of the Delimitation Commission, No. 230 Daspur Assembly constituency is composed of the following: Daspur II community development block, and Basudevpur, Daspur I, Daspur II, Nandanpur I, Nandanpur II and Panchberia gram panchayats of Daspur I community development block.

Daspur Assembly constituency is part of No. 32 Ghatal (Lok Sabha constituency). It was earlier a part of the Panskura (Lok Sabha constituency).

== Members of the Legislative Assembly ==
| Year | Name | Party |
|---|---|---|
| 1952 | Mrigendra Bhattachariya | Communist Party of India |
| 1957 | Bhabani Ranjan Panja | Indian National Congress |
| 1962 | Mrigendra Bhattachariyya | Communist Party of India |
| 1967 | B. C. Sasmal | Indian National Congress |
| 1969 | Mrigendra Bhattacharjya | Communist Party of India |
| 1971 | Mrigendra Bhattacharjya | Communist Party of India (Marxist) |
| 1972 | Prabhas Chandra Phodikar | Communist Party of India (Marxist) |
| 1977 | Prabhas Chandra Phodikar | Communist Party of India (Marxist) |
| 1982 | Prabhas Poodikar | Communist Party of India (Marxist) |
| 1987 | Prabhas Poodikar | Communist Party of India (Marxist) |
| 1991 | Prabhas Poodikar | Communist Party of India (Marxist) |
| 1996 | Mukhopadhaya Chitta Ranjan | Communist Party of India (Marxist) |
| 2001 | Ajit Bhunia | All India Trinamool Congress |
| 2006 | Sunil Adhikari | Communist Party of India (Marxist) |
| 2011 | Ajit Bhunia | All India Trinamool Congress |
| 2012^ | Mamata Bhunia | All India Trinamool Congress |
| 2016 | Mamata Bhunia | All India Trinamool Congress |
| 2021 | Mamata Bhunia | All India Trinamool Congress |
| 2026 | Tapan Kumar Dutta | Bharatiya Janata Party |

== Election results ==
=== 2026 ===
2026 West Bengal Legislative Assembly election: Daspur
| Party | Candidate | Votes | % | ±% |
|---|---|---|---|---|
| BJP | Tapan Kumar Dutta | 133,071 | 52.8 | ▲13.28 |
| AITC | Ashis Hudait | 100,937 | 40.05 | ▼11.53 |
| CPI(M) | Ranajit Pal | 12,278 | 4.87 | ▼2.79 |
| NOTA | None of the above | 1,711 | 0.68 | ▲0.07 |
| Majority | | 32,134 | 12.75 | ▲0.69 |
| Turnout | | 252,047 | 85.08 | ▲10.45 |
| BJP gain from AITC | | Swing | | |

=== 2021 ===
West Bengal assembly elections, 2021: Daspur
| Party | Candidate | Votes | % | ±% |
|---|---|---|---|---|
| AITC | Mamata Bhunia | 114,753 | 51.58 | |
| BJP | Prasanta Bera | 87,911 | 39.52 | |
| CPI(M) | Dhruba Sekhar Mandal | 17,045 | 7.66 | |
| NOTA | None of the above | 1,368 | 0.61 | |
| Majority | | 26,842 | 12.06 | |
| Turnout | | 222,464 | 74.63 | |
| AITC hold | | Swing | | |

=== 2016 ===
West Bengal assembly elections, 2016: Daspur
| Party | Candidate | Votes | % | ±% |
|---|---|---|---|---|
| AITC | Mamata Bhunia | 113,603 | 52.82 | |
| CPI(M) | Swapan Santra | 84,864 | 39.45 | |
| BJP | Dipak Kumar Pramanik | 12,626 | 5.87 | |
| NOTA | None of the above | 2,104 | 0.98 | |
| SUCI(C) | Madhusudan Manna | 1,899 | 0.88 | |
| Majority | | 28,739 | 13.36 | |
| Turnout | | 215,086 | 78.40 | |
| AITC hold | | Swing | | |

=== 2012 by-election ===
In 2012, a by-election was necessitated by the death of sitting Trinamool Congress MLA Ajit Bhunia. Mamata Bhunia of AITC defeated her nearest rival Samar Mukherjee of CPI(M) by 18,928 votes.

=== 2011 ===
West Bengal assembly elections, 2011: Daspur
| Party | Candidate | Votes | % | ±% |
|---|---|---|---|---|
| AITC | Ajit Bhunia | 109,048 | 54.76 | +4.08# |
| CPI(M) | Sunil Adhikari | 84,121 | 42.24 | −7.08 |
| BJP | Sujit Pain | 5,966 | 3.00 | |
| Turnout | | 199,135 | 82.2 | |
| AITC gain from CPI(M) | | Swing | | |

=== 1977-2006 ===
In the 2006 state assembly elections, Sunil Adhikari of CPI(M) won the Daspur assembly seat, defeating his nearest rival, Ajit Bhunia of Trinamool Congress. Ajit Bhunia of Trinamool Congress defeated Chaittaranajan Mukhopadhyay of CPI(M). in 2001. Contests in most years were multi cornered but only winners and runners are being mentioned. Chittaranjan Mukhopadhyay of CPI(M) defeated Jagannanth Goswami of Congress in 1996. Prabhas Phadikar of CPI(M) defeated Asit Bandopadhyay of Congress in 1991, Paresh Mondal of Congress in 1987, Sudhir Bera of Congress in 1982, and Bankim Chandra Sasmal of Janata Party in 1977.

=== 1952-1972 ===
Sudhir Chandra Bera of Congress won both in 1972 and 1971. Mrigendra Bhattacharya of CPI(M) won in 1969. B.C.Sasmal of Congress won in 1967. Mrigendra Bhattacharya of CPI won in 1962. Bhabani Ranjan Panja of Congress won in 1957. In independent India's first election in 1951 the Daspur seat was won by Mrigendra Bhattacharya of CPI.
