= Dwadash Shiva Temples =

Hindu Temples dedicated to Lord Shiva in Kolkata

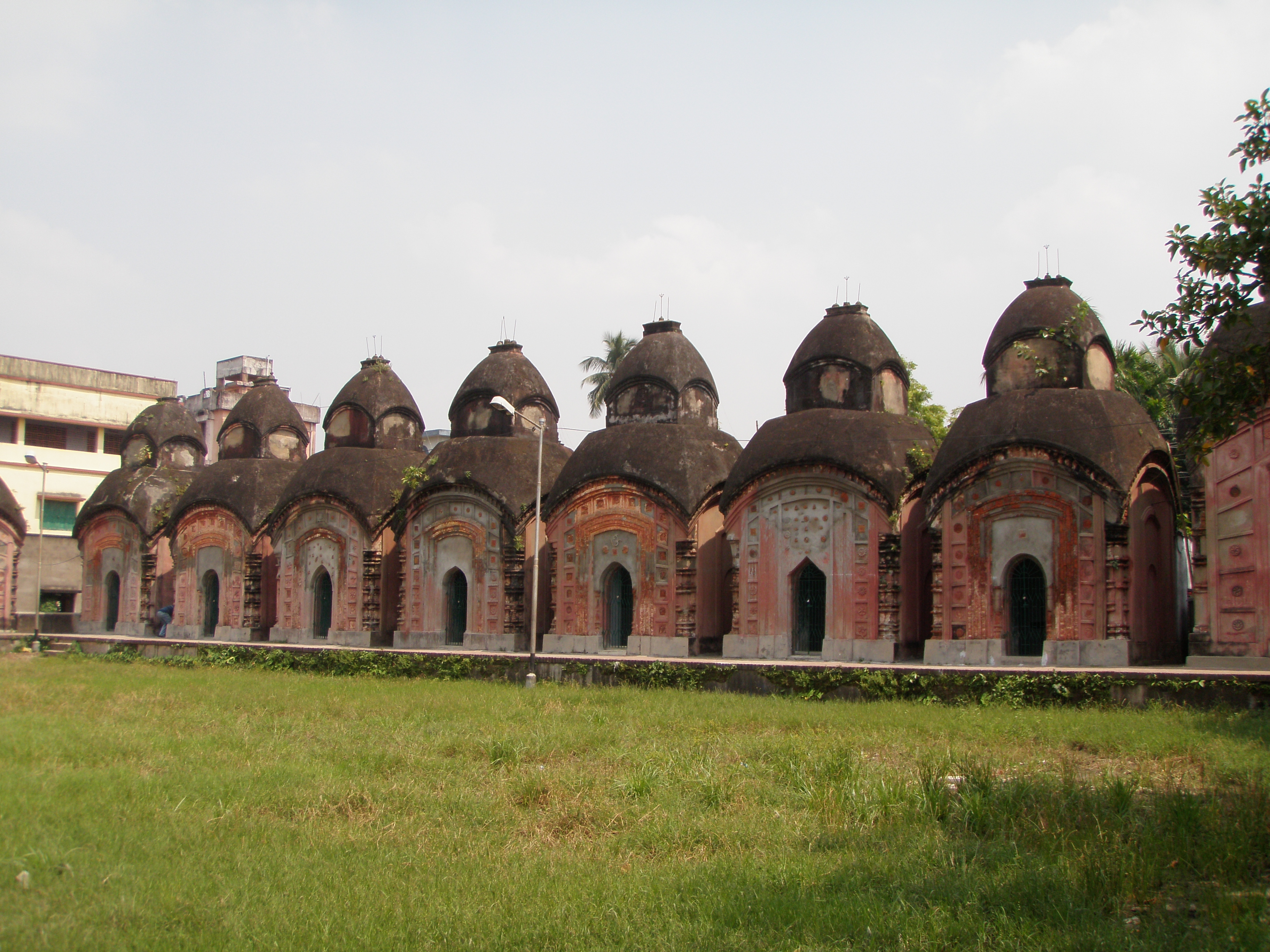
- Dwadash Shiva temples

Religion
- Affiliation: Hinduism
- District: Kolkata
- Deity: Lord Shiva

Location
- Location: Barisha locality
- State: West Bengal
- Country: India

Architecture
- Creator: Raja Santosh Ray Chowdhury
- Completed: 17th century

Dwadash Shiva Temples are ancient Hindu temples located in Barisha locality of Kolkata, West Bengal, India, dedicated to God Shiva. The cluster of 12 temples were built in athchala style by Raja Santosh Ray Chowdhury over 350 years ago.
