= Pingla =

- Village
- Location in West Bengal, India Pingla (India)
- Coordinates: 22°16′18.9″N 87°35′08.4″E
- Country: India
- State: West Bengal
- District: Paschim Medinipur

Population (2011)
  - Total: 5,253

Languages
  - Official: Bengali, English
- Time zone: UTC+5:30 (IST)
- PIN: 721140 (Pingla)
- Telephone/STD code: 03228
- Lok Sabha constituency: Ghatal
- Vidhan Sabha constituency: Debra
- Website: paschimmedinipur.gov.in

Pingla is a village in the Pingla CD block in the Kharagpur subdivision of the Paschim Medinipur district in the state of West Bengal, India.

== Geography ==
Cities and towns in the northern part of Kharagpur subdivision (including Khararagpur I & II, Debra and Pingla CD blocks) of Paschim Medinipur district
M: municipal city/ town, CT: census town, R: rural/ urban centre, H: historical/ religious centre, F: facilities
Owing to space constraints in the small map, the actual locations in a larger map may vary slightly

=== Location ===
Pingla is located at 22°16′18.9″N 87°35′08.4″E.

=== Area overview ===
Kharagpur subdivision, shown partly in the map alongside, mostly has alluvial soils, except in two CD blocks in the west – Kharagpur I and Keshiary, which mostly have lateritic soils. Around 74% of the total cultivated area is cropped more than once. With a density of population of 787 per km^{2}nearly half of the district’s population resides in this subdivision. 14.33% of the population lives in urban areas and 86.67% lives in the rural areas.

Note: The map alongside presents some of the notable locations in the subdivision. All places marked in the map are linked in the larger full screen map.

== Demographics ==
As per 2011 Census of India Pingla had a total population of 5,253 of which 2,639 (50%) were males and 2,614 (50%) were females. Population below 6 years was 665. The total number of literates in Pingla was 3,538 (67.35% of the population over 6 years).

== Civic administration ==
=== CD block HQ ===
The headquarters of Pingla CD block are located at Pingla.

=== Police station ===
Pingla police station has jurisdiction over Pingla CD Block.

== Education ==
Pingla Thana Mahavidyalaya, located at Maligram, was set up in 1965. It is affiliated to Vidyasagar University and as of 2016 offers undergraduate courses in Humanities, Commerce and Science. Post-graduate programme in Bengali was added in 2014-15 and efforts are on to add PG programme in commerce.

== Healthcare ==
Pingla Rural Hospital, with 30 beds at Pingla, is the major Government medical facility in the Pingla CD block.
