= Raj Ballabh =

- Village
- Location in West Bengal, India Raj Ballabh (India)
- Coordinates: 22.295917°N 87.580667°E
- Country: India
- State: West Bengal
- District: Paschim Medinipur

Population (2011)
  - Total: 819

Languages
  - Official: Bengali, English
- Time zone: UTC+5:30 (IST)
- PIN: 721140
- Telephone/STD code: 03222
- Lok Sabha constituency: Ghatal
- Vidhan Sabha constituency: Pingla
- Website: paschimmedinipur.gov.in

Raj Ballabh is a village in the Pingla CD block in the Kharagpur subdivision of the Paschim Medinipur district in the state of West Bengal, India.

== Geography ==
Cities and towns in the northern part of Kharagpur subdivision (including Khararagpur I & II, Debra and Pingla CD blocks) of Paschim Medinipur district
M: municipal city/ town, CT: census town, R: rural/ urban centre, H: historical/ religious centre, F: facilities
Owing to space constraints in the small map, the actual locations in a larger map may vary slightly

=== Location ===
Raj Ballabh is located at 22.295917°N 87.580667°E.

=== Area overview ===
Kharagpur subdivision, shown partly in the map alongside, mostly has alluvial soils, except in two CD blocks in the west – Kharagpur I and Keshiary, which mostly have lateritic soils. Around 74% of the total cultivated area is cropped more than once. With a density of population of 787 per km^{2}nearly half of the district's population resides in this subdivision. 14.33% of the population lives in urban areas and 86.67% lives in the rural areas.

Note: The map alongside presents some of the notable locations in the subdivision. All places marked in the map are linked in the larger full screen map.

== Demographics ==
According to the 2011 Census of India, Raj Ballabh had a total population of 819, of which 404 (49%) were males and 415 (51%) were females. There were 96 persons in the age range of 0–6 years. The total number of literate persons in Raj Ballabh was 614 (84.92% of the population over 6 years).

== Raj Ballabh picture gallery ==
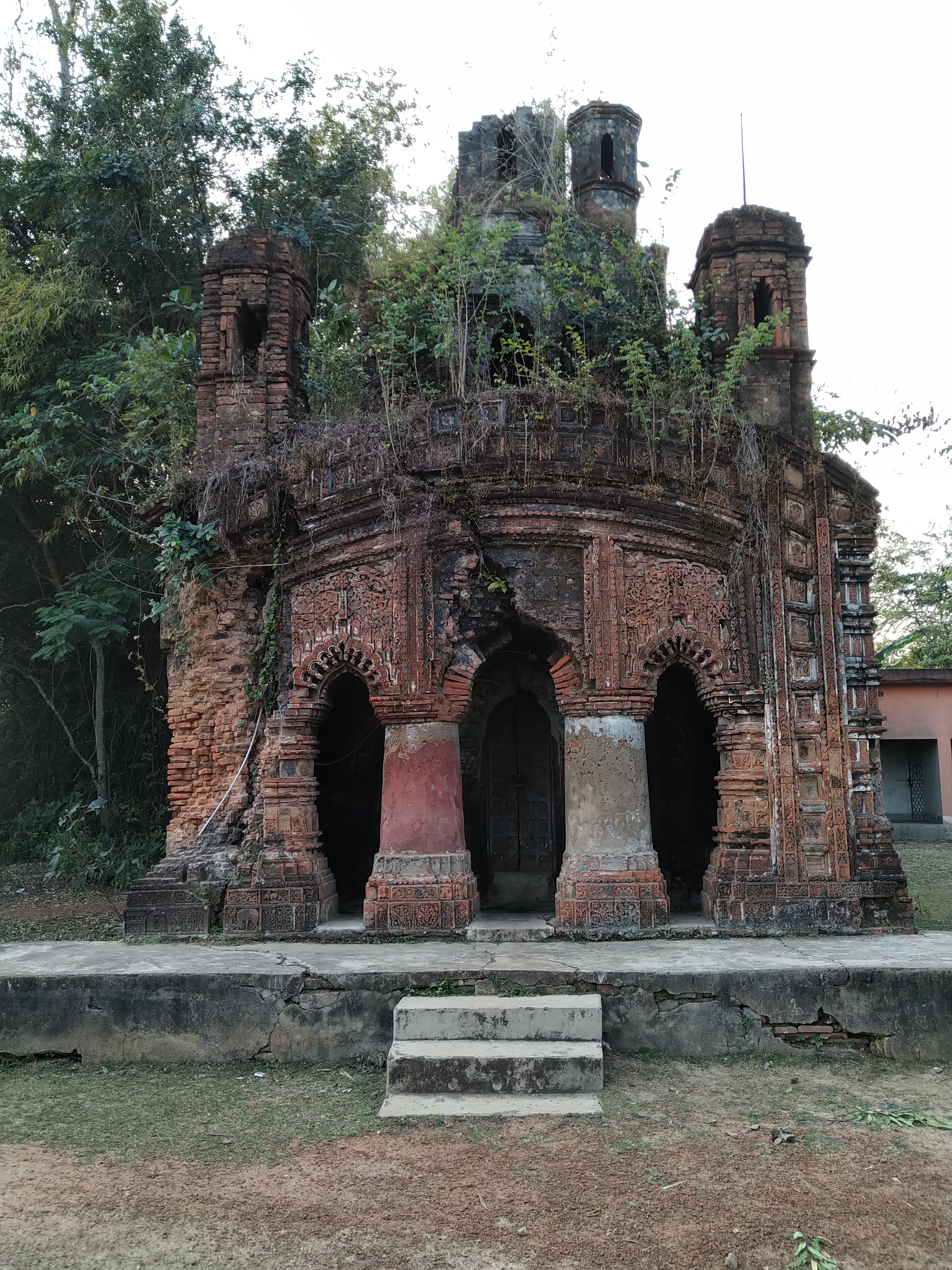
Nava-ratna Rameshwar temple in perilous position

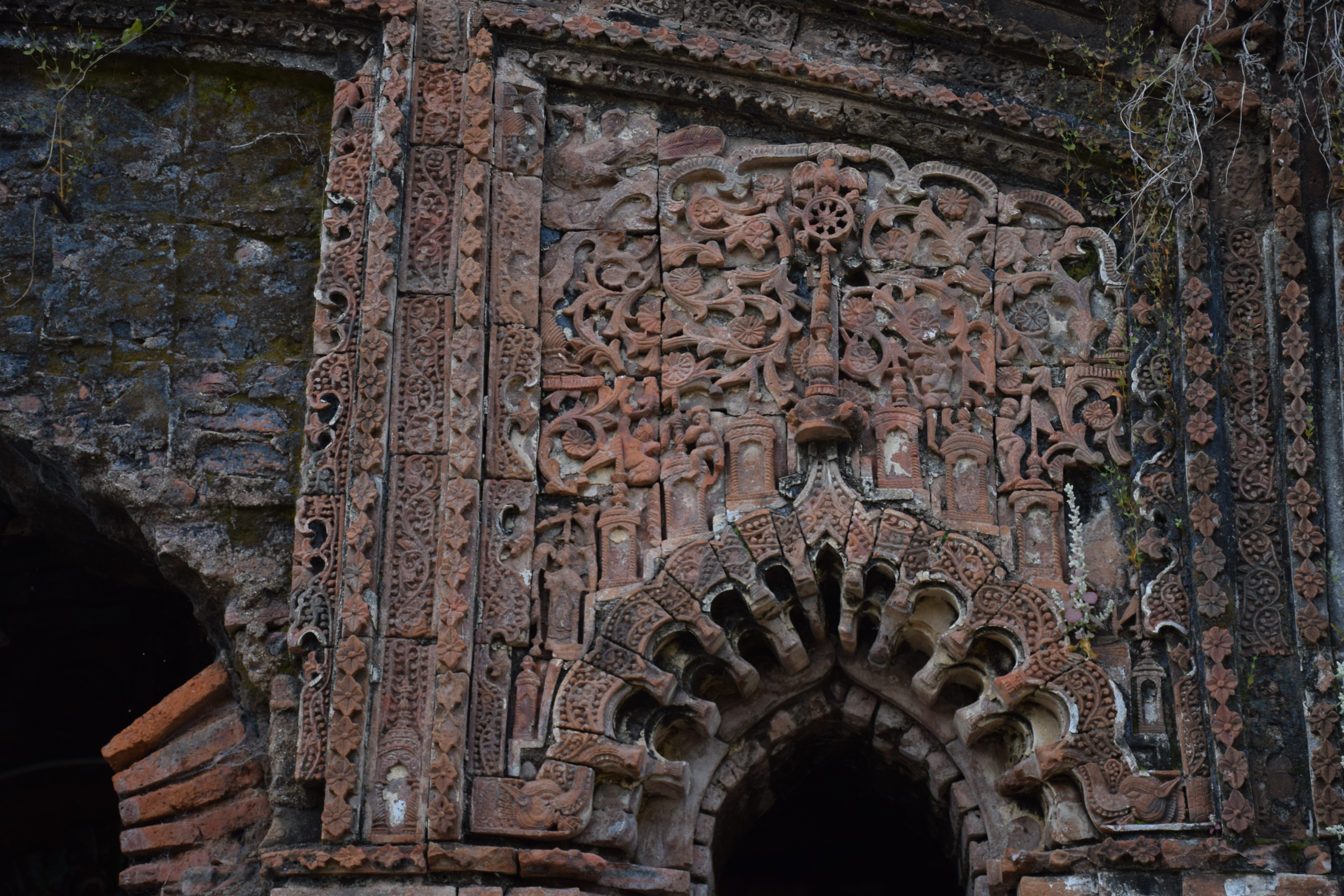
Terracotta relief in Rameshwar temple

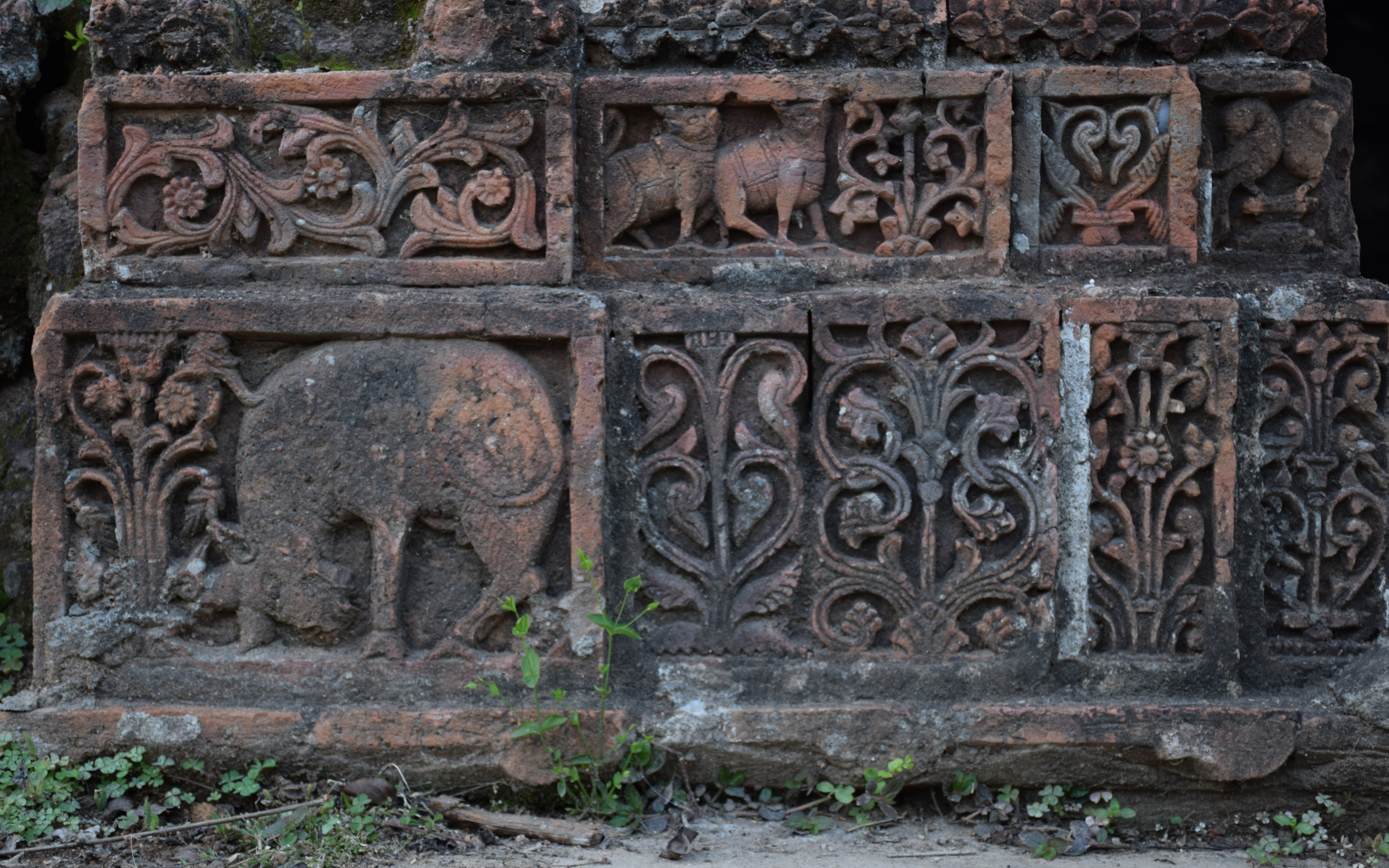
Terracotta relief in Rameshwar temple
