= Dhaneshwar =

Dhaneshwar is a given name.

== People with the given name ==
- Dhaneshwar Damry, Mauritian politician
- Dhaneshwar Majhi (1941–2024), Indian politician
- Dhaneshwar Mandal, Indian academic

== See also ==
- Dhaneshwarpur Madhyabar
- Dnyaneshwar
- Dhaneshwar Nath Mahadev Mandir
