= Pingla (community development block) =

- Community development block
- Coordinates: 22.27191°N 87.58568°E
- Country: India
- State: West Bengal
- District: Paschim Medinipur

Government
  - Type: Federal democracy

Area
  - Total: 224.48 km^{2} (86.67 sq mi)
- Elevation: 17 m (56 ft)

Population (2011)
  - Total: 194,809
  - Density: 867.82/km^{2} (2,247.7/sq mi)

Languages
  - Official: Bengali, English
- Time zone: UTC+5:30 (IST)
- PIN: 721140 (Pingla)
- Telephone/STD code: 03222
- ISO 3166 code: IN-WB
- Vehicle registration: WB 34
- Literacy: 83.57%
- Lok Sabha constituency: Ghatal
- Vidhan Sabha constituency: Pingla, Sabang
- Website: paschimmedinipur.gov.in

Pingla is a community development block that forms an administrative division in the Kharagpur subdivision of Paschim Medinipur district in the Indian state of West Bengal.

== Geography ==
Pingla CD block is a flood-prone area affected by water-logging, leading to loss of crops. In this block, 100% of the cultivated area has highly productive alluvial soil.

Pingla is located at 22°16′19″N 87°35′08″E.

Pingla CD block is bounded by Debra CD block in the north, Panskura and Moyna CD blocks, in Purba Medinipur district, in the east, Sabang CD block in the south and Kharagpur II CD block in the west.

It is located 36 km from Midnapore, the district headquarters.

Pingla CD block has an area of 224.48 km^{2}. It has 1 panchayat samity, 10 gram panchayats, 142 gram sansads (village councils), 182 mouzas and 175 inhabited villages. Pingla police station serves this block. Headquarters of this CD block is at Pingla.

Gram panchayats of Pingla block/ panchayat samiti are: Kusumda, Jamna, Dhaneswarpur, Karkai, Maligram, Khirai, Gobardhanpur, Pindrui, Jalchak-I, Jalchak-II.

== Demographics ==
=== Population ===
According to the 2011 Census of India, Pingla CD block had a population of 194,809, all of it rural. There were 99,988 (51%) males and 94,821 (49%) females. Population in the age range 0–6 years was 22,719. Scheduled Castes numbered 16,428 (8.43%) and Scheduled Tribes numbered 19,322 (9.92%).

According to the 2001 census, Pingla block had a total population of 170,792, out of which 88,251 were males and 82,541 were females. Pingla block registered a population growth of 14.25 per cent during the 1991-2001 decade. Decadal growth for the combined Midnapore district was 14.87 per cent. Decadal growth in West Bengal was 17.45 per cent.

Large villages (with 4,000+ population) in Pingla CD block are (2011 census figures in brackets): Pingla (5,253), Khirai (6,427), Maligram (11,337), Pindrui (4,384), Dangalsa (5,190) and Jalchak (6,793).

Other villages in Pingla CD block are (2011 census figures in brackets): Gobardhanpur (3,665), Karkai (3,113), Dhaneshwarpur Uttar Bar (539), Dhaneshwarpur Madhyabar (1,247), Dhaneshwarpur Jamua (152), Dhaneswarour Paikan Uttar Bar (697), Dhaneshwarpur Paikan Dakhin Bar (270), Dhaneshwarpur Paschim Bar (1,852), Jamna (3,336), Karkai (3,113) and Raj Ballabh (819).

=== Literacy ===
According to the 2011 census the total number of literate persons in Pingla CD block was 143,882 (83.57% of the population over 6 years) out of which males numbered 79,657 (90.22% of the male population over 6 years) and females numbered 64,165 (76.57% of the female population over 6 years). The gender gap in literacy rates was 13.65%.

See also – List of West Bengal districts ranked by literacy rate

Literacy in CD blocks of
Paschim Medinipur district
Jhargram subdivision
Binpur I – 69.74%
Binpur II – 70.46%
Gopiballavpur I – 65.44%
Gopiballavpur II – 71.40%
Jamboni – 72.63%
Jhargram – 72.23%
Nayagram – 63.70%
Sankrail – 73.35%
Medinipur Sadar subdivision
Garhbeta I – 72.21%
Garhbeta II – 75.87%
Garhbeta III – 73.42%
Keshpur – 77.88%
Midnapore Sadar – 70.48%
Salboni – 74.87%
Ghatal subdivision
Chandrakona I – 78.93%
Chandrakona II – 75.96%
Daspur I – 83.99%
Daspur II – 85.62%
Ghatal – 81.08%
Kharagpur subdivision
Dantan I – 73.53%
Dantan II – 82.45%
Debra – 82.03%
Keshiari – 76.78%
Kharagpur I – 77.06%
Kharagpur II – 76.08%
Mohanpur – 80.51%
Narayangarh – 78.31%
Pingla – 83.57%
Sabang – 86.84%
2011 Census: CD Block Wise

Primary Census Abstract Data

=== Language and religion ===
Religion in Pingla CD block (2011)
Hinduism	85.61%
Islam	14.29%
Other or not stated	0.10%

In the 2011 census Hindus formed 85.61% of the population in Pingla CD block. Muslims formed 14.29% of the population. Others formed 0.10% of the population. Others include Addi Bassi, Marang Boro, Santal, Saranath, Sari Dharma, Sarna, Alchchi, Bidin, Sant, Saevdharm, Seran, Saran, Sarin, Kheria, Christian and other religious communities. In 2001, Hindus were 87.20% and Muslims 12.38% of the population respectively.

Languages of Pingla CD block (2011)
1. Bengali (91.1%)
2. Santali (4.16%)
3. Hindi (2.79%)
4. Urdu (1.17%)
5. Others (0.81%)

At the time of the 2011 census, 91.07% of the population spoke Bengali, 4.16% Santali, 2.79% Hindi and 1.17% Urdu as their first language.

== BPL families ==
In Pingla CD block 50.51% families were living below poverty line in 2007.

According to the District Human Development Report of Paschim Medinipur: The 29 CD blocks of the district were classified into four categories based on the poverty ratio. Nayagram, Binpur II and Jamboni CD blocks have very high poverty levels (above 60%). Kharagpur I, Kharagpur II, Sankrail, Garhbeta II, Pingla and Mohanpur CD blocks have high levels of poverty (50-60%), Jhargram, Midnapore Sadar, Dantan I, Gopiballavpur II, Binpur I, Dantan II, Keshiari, Chandrakona I, Gopiballavpur I, Chandrakona II, Narayangarh, Keshpur, Ghatal, Sabang, Garhbeta I, Salboni, Debra and Garhbeta III CD blocks have moderate levels of poverty (25-50%) and Daspur II and Daspur I CD blocks have low levels of poverty (below 25%).

== Economy ==
=== Infrastructure ===
175 or 96% of mouzas in Pingla CD block were electrified by 31 March 2014.

175 mouzas in Pingla CD block had drinking water facilities in 2013-14. There were 113 fertiliser depots, 124 seed stores and 38 fair price shops in the CD Block.

=== Agriculture ===
Persons engaged in agriculture
in Pingla CD block
1. Bargadars (3.75%)
2. Patta holders (26.1%)
3. Small farmers (3.29%)
4. Marginal farmers (19.4%)
5. Agricultural labourers (46.9%)

Although the Bargadari Act of 1950 recognised the rights of bargadars to a higher share of crops from the land that they tilled, it was not implemented fully. Large tracts, beyond the prescribed limit of land ceiling, remained with the rich landlords. From 1977 onwards major land reforms took place in West Bengal. Land in excess of land ceiling was acquired and distributed amongst the peasants. Following land reforms land ownership pattern has undergone transformation. In 2013-14, persons engaged in agriculture in Pingla CD block could be classified as follows: bargadars 3.75%, patta (document) holders 26.70%, small farmers (possessing land between 1 and 2 hectares) 3.29%, marginal farmers (possessing land up to 1 hectare) 19.35% and agricultural labourers 46.90%.

In 2005-06 the nett cropped area in Pingla CD block was 18,600 hectares out of the total geographical area of 21,948 hectares and the area in which more than one crop was grown was 18,377 hectares.

The extension of irrigation has played a role in growth of the predominantly agricultural economy. In 2013-14, the total area irrigated in Pingla CD block was 13,170 hectares, out of which 2,000 hectares were irrigated by tank water, 10,400 hectares by deep tubewells and 770 hectares by other methods.

In 2013-14, Pingla CD block produced 36,526 tonnes of Aman paddy, the main winter crop, from 17,429 hectares, 2,738 tonnes of Aus paddy (summer crop) from 1,372 hectares, 44,560 tonnes of Boro paddy (spring crop) from 14,225 hectares, 53 tonnes of wheat from 24 hectares, 14,027 tonnes of Jute from 983 hectares and 38 tonnes of potatoes from 2 hectares. It also produced pulses and oilseeds.

=== Banking ===
In 2013-14, Pingla CD block had offices of 6 commercial banks and 2 gramin banks.

== Transport ==
Pingla CD block has 24 originating/ terminating bus routes. The nearest railway station is 11 km from the CD block headquarters.

== Education ==
In 2013-14, Pingla CD block had 145 primary schools with 11,830 students, 6 middle schools with 400 students, 11 high schools with 6,371 students and 18 higher secondary schools with 18,935 students. Pingla CD block had 1 general college with 1,005 students, 1 technical / professional institutions with 100 students and 321 institutions for special and non-formal education with 12,373 students.

The United Nations Development Programme considers the combined primary and secondary enrolment ratio as the simple indicator of educational achievement of the children in the school going age. The infrastructure available is important. In Pingla CD block out of the total 145 primary schools in 2008-2009, 22 had pucca buildings, 64 partially pucca, 16 kucha and 43 multiple type.

Pingla Thana Mahavidyalaya is a co-educational college established in 1965 at Maligram. Affiliated to Vidyasagar University, it offers honours courses in Bengali, English, Sanskrit, history, philosophy, political science, geography, education, physics, chemistry, mathematics and botany.

== Culture ==
The Pingla CD block has several heritage temples.

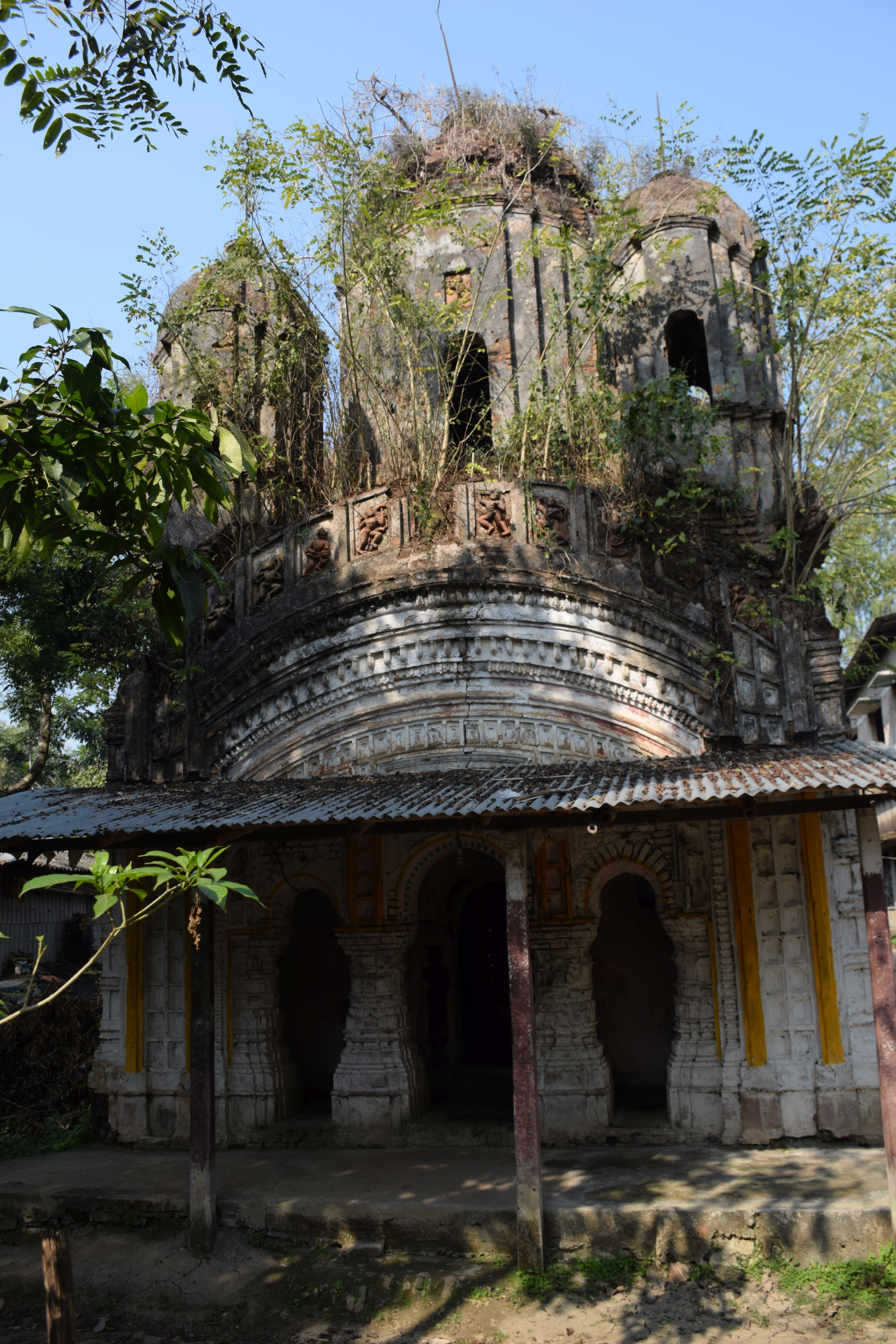
Jalchak: Pancha ratna Radha Krishna temple (in picture) and pancha ratna Ram Chandra temple, built in 1817, both in perilous condition.

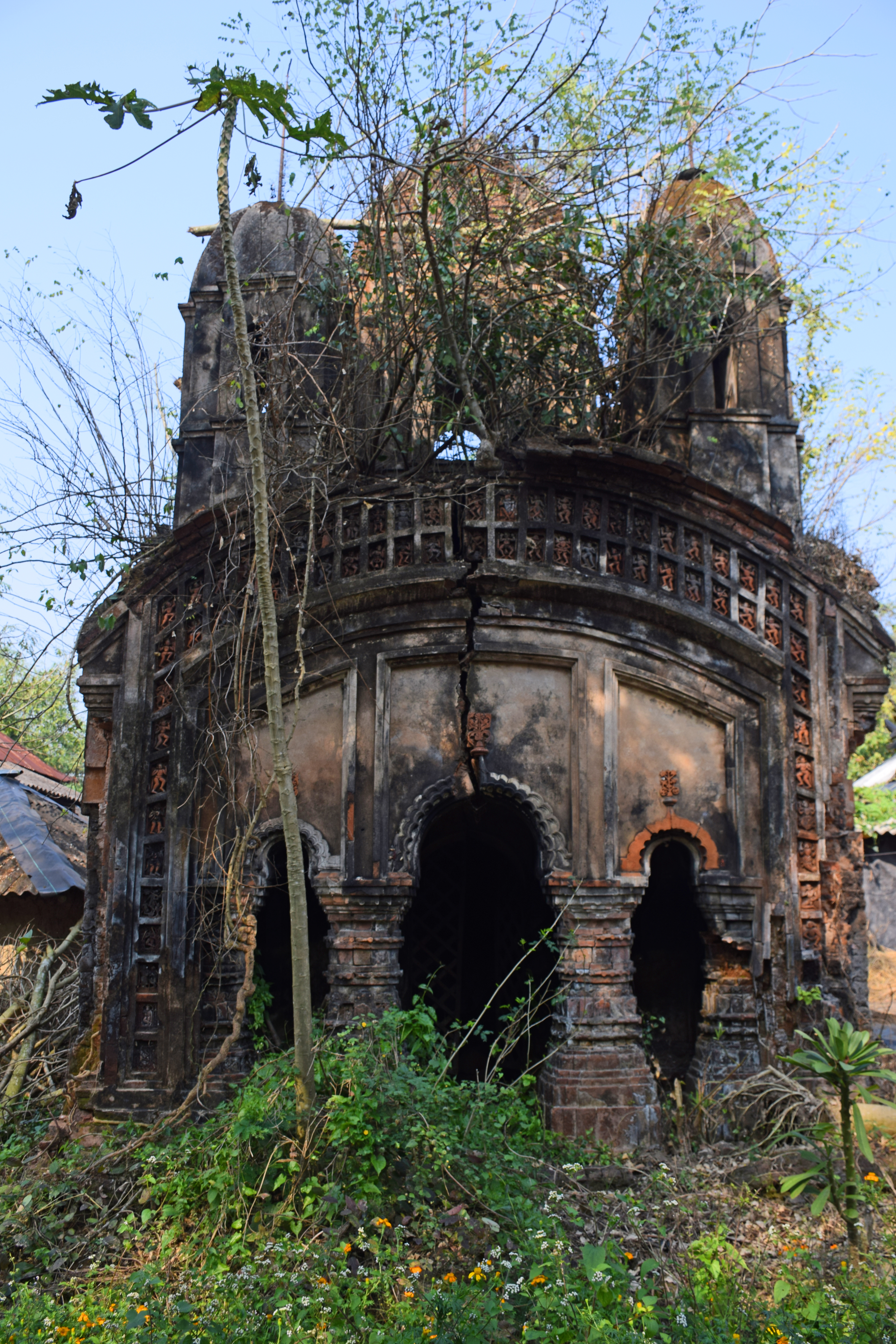
Dhaneshwarpur Madhyabar: Pancha ratna Laxmi Janardana temple, built in the 19th century, in ruinous condition.

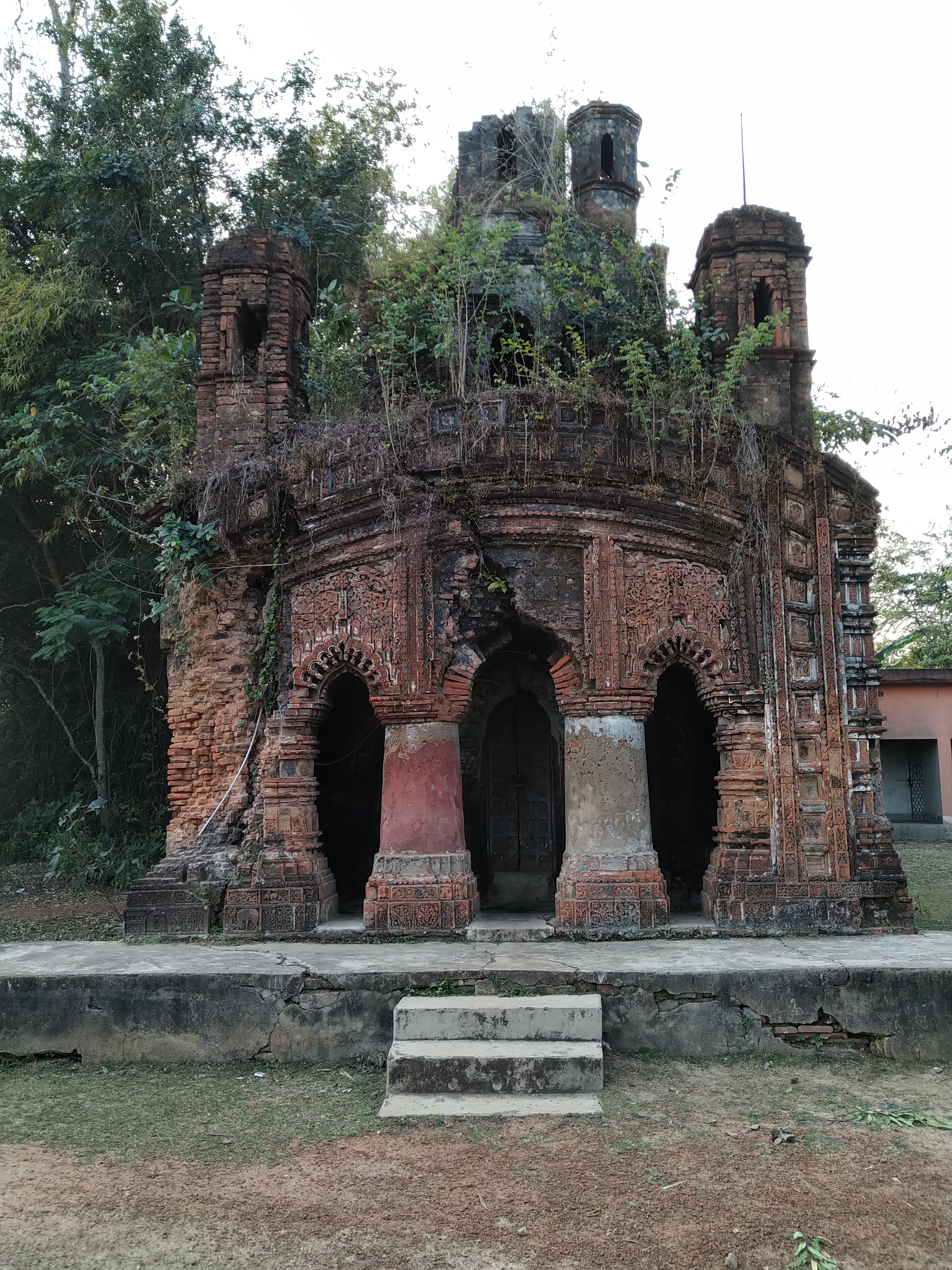
Raj Ballabh: Nava ratna Rameswar temple in perilous condodition.

== Healthcare ==
In 2014, Pingla CD block had 1 rural hospital, 3 primary health centres and 1 private nursing home with total 57 beds and 10 doctors. It had 29 family welfare sub centres and 1 family welfare centre. 3,554 patients were treated indoor and 100,276 patients were treated outdoor in the hospitals, health centres and subcentres of the CD block.

Pingla Rural Hospital, with 30 beds at Pingla, is the major Government medical facility in the Pingla CD block. There are primary health centres at: Jalchak (with 10 beds), Harma (PO Gobardhanpur) (with 6 beds) and Boalia (PO Dhaneswarpur) (with 6 beds)
