= Sabang Assembly constituency =

Sabang
- Constituency No. 226 for the West Bengal Legislative Assembly
- Interactive Map Outlining Sabang Assembly Constituency

Constituency details
- Country: India
- Region: East India
- State: West Bengal
- District: Paschim Medinipur
- Lok Sabha constituency: Ghatal
- Established: 1951
- Total electors: 206,413
- Reservation: None

Member of Legislative Assembly
- 18th West Bengal Legislative Assembly
- Incumbent Amal Kumar Panda
- Party: BJP
- Alliance: NDA
- Elected year: 2026
- Preceded by: Manas Bhunia

Most Successful Parties from Sabang Assembly
1. Indian National Congress (9 times) (60.0%)
2. Biplobi Bangla Congress (2 times) (13.3%)
3. All India Trinamool Congress (2 times) (13.3%)
4. Independent politician (1 time) (6.67%)
5. Bharatiya Janata Party (1 time) (6.67%)

Sabang Assembly constituency is an assembly constituency in Paschim Medinipur district in the Indian state of West Bengal.

== Overview ==
As per orders of the Delimitation Commission, No. 226 Sabang Assembly constituency is composed of the following: Sabang community development block and Jalchak I, Jalchak II and Maligram gram panchayats of Pingla community development block.

Sabang Assembly constituency is part of No. 32 Ghatal (Lok Sabha constituency). It was earlier part of Panskura (Lok Sabha constituency).

== Members of the Legislative Assembly ==
Year	Name of M.L.A.	Party Affiliation
1951	Gopal Chandra Das Adhikary	Indian National Congress
1957	Gopal Chandra Das Adhikary	Indian National Congress
1962	Aditya Kumar Bakura	Indian National Congress
1977	Gouranga Samanta	Biplobi Bangla Congress
1982	Manas Ranjan Bhunia	Indian National Congress
1987	Manas Ranjan Bhunia	Indian National Congress
1991	Manas Ranjan Bhunia	Indian National Congress
1996	Makhan Lal Bangal	Independent
2001	Tushar Kanti Laya	Biplobi Bangla Congress
2006	Manas Ranjan Bhunia	Indian National Congress
2011	Manas Ranjan Bhunia	Indian National Congress
2016	Manas Ranjan Bhunia	Indian National Congress
2017^	Geeta Rani Bhunia	Trinamool Congress
2021	Manas Ranjan Bhunia	Trinamool Congress
2026	Amal Kumar Panda	Bharatiya Janata Party

- ^ denotes by-election

== Election results ==
=== 2026 ===
2026 West Bengal Legislative Assembly election: Sabang
Party	Candidate	Votes	%	±%
BJP	Amal Kumar Panda	127,783	49.66	▲6.38
AITC	Manas Bhunia	116,647	45.33	▼2.13
CPI(M)	Nakul Chandra Bera	6,978	2.71	
NOTA	None of the above	1,305	0.51	▼0.14
Majority		11,136	4.33	▲0.15
Turnout		257,340	93.63	▲4.42
BJP gain from AITC		Swing		

=== 2021 ===
2021 West Bengal Legislative Assembly election: Sabang
Party	Candidate	Votes	%	±%
AITC	Manas Ranjan Bhunia	112,098	47.46	▼3.75
BJP	Amulya Maity	102,234	43.28	▲25.2
INC	Chiranjib Bhowmik	17,443	7.38	▼1.33
NOTA	None of the above	1,534	0.65	
Majority		9,864	4.18	
Turnout		236,201	89.21	
AITC hold		Swing		

=== 2017 ===
By Election, 2017: Sabang
Party	Candidate	Votes	%	±%
AITC	Geeta Rani Bhunia	106,185	51.21	▲14.61
BBC	Rita Mandal (Jana)	41,989	20.25	New entry
BJP	Antara Bhattacharya	37,483	18.08	▲15.48
INC	Ranjib Bhowmik	18,063	8.71	▼50.99
SUCI(C)	Dinesh Maikap	2,079	1.00	▼0.20
NOTA	None of the Above	1,535	0.74	▲0.04
Majority		64,196	30.96	▲7.86
Turnout		207,334	84.44	
AITC gain from INC		Swing		

=== 2016 ===
West Bengal assembly elections, 2016: Sabang
Party	Candidate	Votes	%	±%
INC	Manas Bhunia	127,987	59.70	▲8.45
AITC	Nirmal Ghosh	77,820	36.60	New entry
BJP	Kashinath Basu	5,610	2.64	▲1.34
SUCI(C)	Dinesh Maikap	2,486	1.17	▲0.09
NOTA	None of the Above	1,489	0.7	
Majority		49,167	23.1	▲16.26
Turnout		212,903	89.1	
INC hold		Swing		

.# Swing calculated on Congress+Trinamool Congress vote percentages taken together in 2006.

=== 2011 ===
In the 2011 election, Manas Ranjan Bhunia of Congress defeated his nearest rival Ram Pada Sahoo of CPI(M).

West Bengal assembly elections, 2011: Sabang
Party	Candidate	Votes	%	±%
INC	Manas Ranjan Bhunia	98,755	51.25	▼1.95#
BBC	Rama Pada Sahoo	85,571	44.41	▼0.57
BJP	Sabyasachi Sau	2,507	1.3	
SUCI	Narayan Chandra Adhikari	2,437	1.26	
BSP	Narayan Chandra Samat	2,171	1.13	
Independent	Ram Krishna Sarkar	1,235	0.64	
Majority		13,184	6.84	
Turnout		192,676	93.94	
INC hold		Swing		

.# Swing calculated on Congress+Trinamool Congress vote percentages taken together in 2006.

=== 2006 ===
2006 West Bengal Legislative Assembly election: Sabang
Party	Candidate	Votes	%	±%
INC	Manas Ranjan Bhunia	68,592	49.70	
CPI(M)	Tushar Kanti Laya	62,079	44.98	
AITC	Amulya Maity	4,828	3.50	
IND	Jagannath Das	2,503	1.81	
Majority		6,513	4.72	
Turnout		138,002		
Swing to INC from CPI(M)		Swing		

=== 2001 ===
2001 West Bengal Legislative Assembly election: Sabang
Party	Candidate	Votes	%	±%
CPI(M)	Tushar Kanti Laya	62,611	51.15	
INC	Manas Ranjan Bhunia	56,354	46.04	
BJP	Nirmal Kumar Bala	1,409	1.15	
IND	Jagannath Das	1,140	0.93	
IND	Sila Bangal	892	0.73	
Majority		6,257	5.11	
Turnout		123,298	91.15	
Swing to CPI(M) from Independent		Swing		

=== 1996 ===
1996 West Bengal Legislative Assembly election: Sabang
Party	Candidate	Votes	%	±%
IND	Bangal Makhanlal	60,453	49.91	
INC	Manas Bhunia	59,628	49.23	
BJP	Jana Nagendranath	594	0.49	
IND	Bhusan Mandal	453	0.37	
Majority		825	0.68	
Turnout		121,167	95.83	
Swing to Independent from INC		Swing		

=== 1991 ===
1991 West Bengal Legislative Assembly election: Sabang
Party	Candidate	Votes	%	±%
INC	Manas Ranjan Bhunia	53,485	50.65	
CPI(M)	Gouranga Samanta	50,414	47.74	
BJP	Jana Nagendra Nath	1,028	0.97	
IND	Bhusan Chandra Mondal	577	0.55	
AMB	Tapas Maity	97	0.09	
Majority		3,071	2.91	
Turnout		106,949	91.41	
INC hold		Swing		

=== 1987 ===
1987 West Bengal Legislative Assembly election: Sabang
Party	Candidate	Votes	%	±%
INC	Manas Ranjan Bhunia	45,376	50.78	
CPI(M)	Hare Krishna Samanta	42,261	47.29	
SUCI(C)	Bhusan Chandra Mondal	1,350	1.51	
IND	Benodbehari Maity	375	0.42	
Majority		3,115	3.49	
Turnout		90,096	89.20	
INC hold		Swing		

=== 1982 ===
1982 West Bengal Legislative Assembly election: Sabang
Party	Candidate	Votes	%	±%
INC	Manas Bhunia	34,815	46.88	
IND	Hemanta Kumar Jana	34,185	46.03	
IND	Gouranga Samanta	2,803	3.77	
JP	Suryya Kanta Mahapatra	1,518	2.04	
IND	Lal Mohan Baskey	943	1.27	
Majority		630	0.85	
Turnout		75,359	87.90	
Swing to INC from BBC		Swing		

=== 1977 ===
1977 West Bengal Legislative Assembly election: Sabang
Party	Candidate	Votes	%	±%
BBC	Gouranga Samanta	19,730	41.94	
JP	Surya Kanta Mahapatra	13,425	28.54	
INC	Gopal Chandra Das Adhikari	12,569	26.72	
IND	Tuhin Baran Maiti	1,016	2.16	
IND	Akash Pattanayak	303	0.64	
Majority		6,305	13.40	
Turnout		47,840	67.94	
Swing to BBC from INC		Swing		

=== 1962 ===
1962 West Bengal Legislative Assembly election: Sabang
Party	Candidate	Votes	%	±%
INC	Aditya Kumar Bakura	25,535	53.01	
IND	Gouranga Chandra Samanta	22,636	46.99	
Majority		2,899	6.02	
Turnout		50,040	69.10	
INC hold		Swing		

=== 1957 ===
1957 West Bengal Legislative Assembly election: Sabang
Party	Candidate	Votes	%	±%
INC	Gopal Chandra Das Adhikari	18,882	50.35	
ABJS	Gauranga Chandra Samanta	13,401	35.73	
CPI	Pulin Behari Maity	4,201	11.20	
IND	Abhoy Charan Tudu (ST)	1,018	2.71	
Majority		5,481	14.62	
Turnout		37,502	58.73	
INC hold		Swing		

=== 1951 ===
1951 West Bengal Legislative Assembly election: Sabang
Party	Candidate	Votes	%	±%
INC	Gopal Chandra Das Adhikary	11,454	36.97	
IND	Gouranga Chandra Samanta	10,474	33.80	
KMPP	Jnanendra Das	5,568	17.97	
Socialist	Jatindra Nath Das	2,546	8.22	
CPI	Pulak Bera	944	3.05	
Majority		980	3.17	
Turnout		30,986	55.83	
INC win (new seat)				
