= Gurudas Dasgupta =

Indian politician (1936–2019)

The Right Honourable Gurudas Dasgupta

Leader of Communist Party of India Parliamentary Party, Lok Sabha
- In office 2005–2014
- Preceded by: P. K. Vasudevan Nair
- Succeeded by: C. N. Jayadevan

Member of Parliament, Lok Sabha
- In office 13 May 2004 – 16 May 2009
- Preceded by: Bikram Sarkar
- Succeeded by: Constituency abolished
- Constituency: Panskura
- In office 16 May 2009 – 16 May 2014
- Preceded by: Office established
- Succeeded by: Deepak Adhikari (Dev)
- Constituency: Ghatal

Member of Parliament, Rajya Sabha
- In office 1985–2000
- Preceded by: Kalyan Roy
- Succeeded by: Biplab Dasgupta

Personal details
- Born: 3 November 1936 Barisal, Bengal Presidency, British India (present-day Barisal, Bangladesh)
- Died: 31 October 2019 (aged 82) Kolkata, West Bengal, India
- Cause of death: Lung cancer
- Party: Communist Party of India
- Spouse: Jayasri Dasgupta (m. 1965)
- Children: One Daughter
- Education: University of Calcutta; Asutosh College (M.Com)

Gurudas Dasgupta (3 November 1936 – 31 October 2019) was an Indian politician and a leader of the Communist Party of India. In the 1950s and 60s, he held several offices as a student leader. Later he was a member of Rajya Sabha for three terms from 1985 to 2000 and of Lok Sabha for two terms from 2004 to 2014.

== Biography ==
Gurudas Dasgupta was born to Nihar Devi and Durga Prosanna Dasgupta on 3 November 1936 in Barisal, British India (now in Bangladesh). On 18 June 1965, he married Jayashri Das Gupta.

He entered politics as a student leader. He served as the General Secretary of Asutosh College Students' Union in 1957 as well as the President and General Secretary of the Undivided Bengal Provincial Students' Federation from 1958 to 1960. In 1965, he was detained under the Defence of India rules. He went into hiding several times during the 1950s–60s.

Dasgupta was the General Secretary of the West Bengal Committee of All India Youth Federation from 1967 to 1977. He was also General Secretary of the West Bengal Youth Festival Preparatory Committee in 1968, 1970 and 1973. He led the Indian delegation at the World Youth Congress held in Budapest in 1970.

He remained in Communist Party of India (CPI) following its split in 1964. In 1970s, he worked in the labour wing of the CPI. He served as the Vice President of All India Trade Union Congress and Bharatiya Khet Mazdoor Union.

He worked as a parliamentarian for 25 years. He was elected as a member of the Rajya Sabha in 1985, 1988 and 1994. Dasgupta was elected as the General Secretary of the All India Trade Union Congress (AITUC) in 2001. He was elected as a member of National Secretariat of CPI in 2004. In 2004, he was elected to the 14th Lok Sabha from Panskura in West Bengal. In 2009, he was elected to the 15th Lok Sabha from Ghatal in West Bengal. He was a member of the Joint Parliamentary Committee on the Harshad Mehta scam and on the 2G spectrum case.

Dasgupta died on 31 October 2019 due to complications of lung cancer.

Lok Sabha
Preceded by Bikram Sarkar	Member of Parliament for Panskura; 2004 – 2009	Succeeded by Constituency ceased to exist
Preceded by Constituency created	Member of Parliament for Ghatal; 2009 – 2014	Succeeded by Dev
Trade union offices
Preceded by K. L. Mahendra	General Secretary of the All India Trade Union Congress; 2001–2017	Succeeded by Amarjeet Kaur
