= Maligram =

- Village
- Location in West Bengal, India Maligram (India)
- Coordinates: 22°17′13.7″N 87°38′30.0″E
- Country: India
- State: West Bengal
- District: Paschim Medinipur

Population (2011)
  - Total: 11,337

Languages
  - Official: Bengali, English
- Time zone: UTC+5:30 (IST)
- Lok Sabha constituency: Ghatal
- Vidhan Sabha constituency: Sabang
- Website: paschimmedinipur.gov.in

Maligram is a village in the Pingla CD block in the Kharagpur subdivision of the Paschim Medinipur district in the state of West Bengal, India.

== Geography ==
Cities and towns in the northern part of Kharagpur subdivision (including Khararagpur I & II, Debra and Pingla CD blocks) of Paschim Medinipur district
M: municipal city/ town, CT: census town, R: rural/ urban centre, H: historical/ religious centre, F: facilities
Owing to space constraints in the small map, the actual locations in a larger map may vary slightly

=== Location ===
Maligram is located at 22°17′13.7″N 87°38′30.0″E.

=== Area overview ===
Kharagpur subdivision, shown partly in the map alongside, mostly has alluvial soils, except in two CD blocks in the west – Kharagpur I and Keshiary, which mostly have lateritic soils. Around 74% of the total cultivated area is cropped more than once. With a density of population of 787 per km^{2}nearly half of the district’s population resides in this subdivision. 14.33% of the population lives in urban areas and 86.67% lives in the rural areas.

Note: The map alongside presents some of the notable locations in the subdivision. All places marked in the map are linked in the larger full screen map.

== Demographics ==
As per 2011 Census of India Maligram had a total population of 11,337 of which 5,747 (51%) were males and 5,590 (49%) were females. Population below 6 years was 1,679. The total number of literates in Maligram was 8,019 (70.73% of the population over 6 years).

== Transport ==
Maligram is on the Dakbaungalow-Moyna Road off Debra-Tabagaria Road.

== Education ==
Pingla Thana Mahavidyalaya, established in 1965, is affiliated to Vidyasagar University. It offers honours courses in Bengali, English, Sanskrit, history, political science, philosophy, education, geography, chemistry, mathematics, physics and botany. It also offers general courses in BA, BSc and BCom.
