= Jalchak =

- Village
- Location in West Bengal, India Jalchak (India)
- Coordinates: 22.243611°N 87.672194°E
- Country: India
- State: West Bengal
- District: Paschim Medinipur

Population (2011)
  - Total: 6,793

Languages
  - Official: Bengali, English
- Time zone: UTC+5:30 (IST)
- PIN: 721155
- Telephone/STD code: 03222
- Lok Sabha constituency: Ghatal
- Vidhan Sabha constituency: Pingla
- Website: paschimmedinipur.gov.in

Jalchak is a village in the Pingla CD block in the Kharagpur subdivision of the Paschim Medinipur district in the state of West Bengal, India.

== Geography ==
Cities and towns in the northern part of Kharagpur subdivision (including Khararagpur I & II, Debra and Pingla CD blocks) of Paschim Medinipur district
M: municipal city/ town, CT: census town, R: rural/ urban centre, H: historical/ religious centre, F: facilities
Owing to space constraints in the small map, the actual locations in a larger map may vary slightly

=== Location ===
Jalchak is located at 22.243611°N 87.672194°E.

=== Area overview ===
Kharagpur subdivision, shown partly in the map alongside, mostly has alluvial soils, except in two CD blocks in the west – Kharagpur I and Keshiary, which mostly have lateritic soils. Around 74% of the total cultivated area is cropped more than once. With a density of population of 787 per km^{2}nearly half of the district's population resides in this subdivision. 14.33% of the population lives in urban areas and 86.67% lives in the rural areas.

Note: The map alongside presents some of the notable locations in the subdivision. All places marked in the map are linked in the larger full screen map.

== Demographics ==
According to the 2011 Census of India, Jalchak had a total population of 6,793, of which 3,620 (53%) were males and 3,173 (47%) were females. There were 825 persons in the age range of 0–6 years. The total number of literate persons in Jalchak was 5,049 (84.60% of the population over 6 years).

== Education ==
Jalchak Nateswari Netaji Vidyayatan is a Bengali-medium co-educational institution established in 1949. The school has facilities for teaching from class V to class XII. It has a library with 4,000 books, 10 computers and a playground.

== Culture ==
David J. McCutchion mentions the Ramchandra temple of Bhattacharya family as a pancha ratna having rekha turrets with curved cornices and porch on three arches, richly terracotta decorated, built in 1817, measuring 18’ 2" square.

== Jalchak picture gallery ==
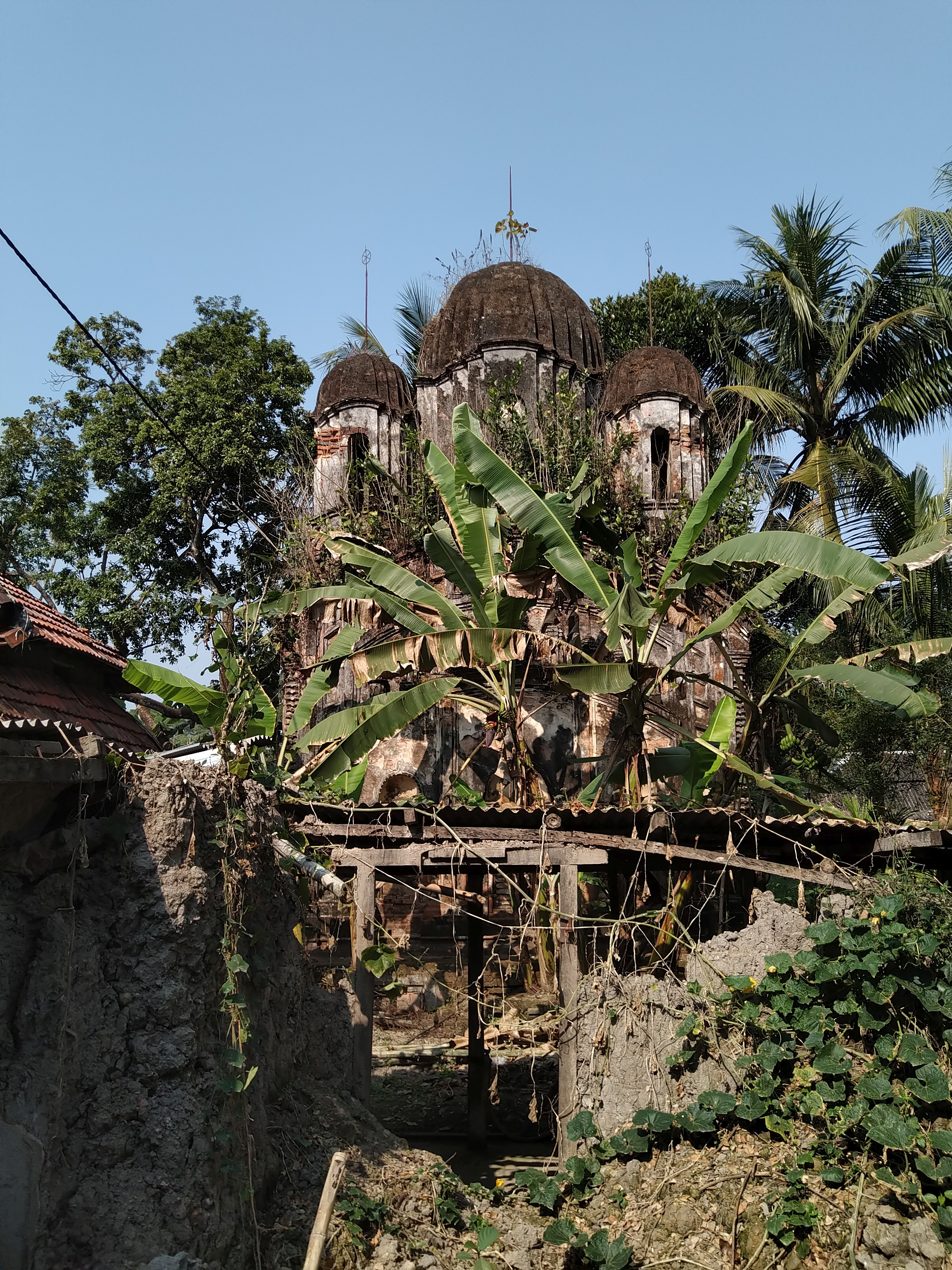
Pancha-ratna Ram Chandra temple in a perilous condition

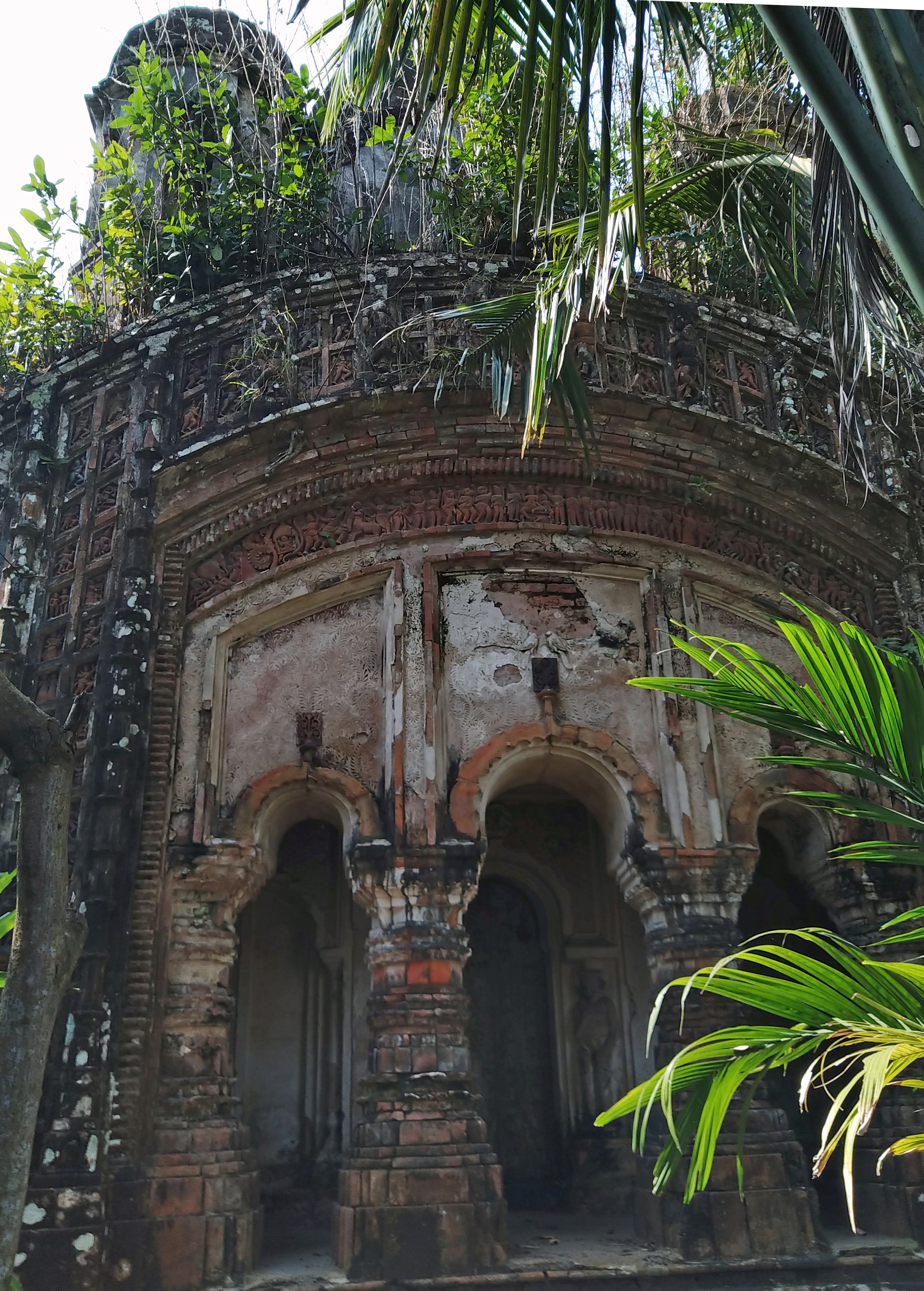
Ram Chandra temple

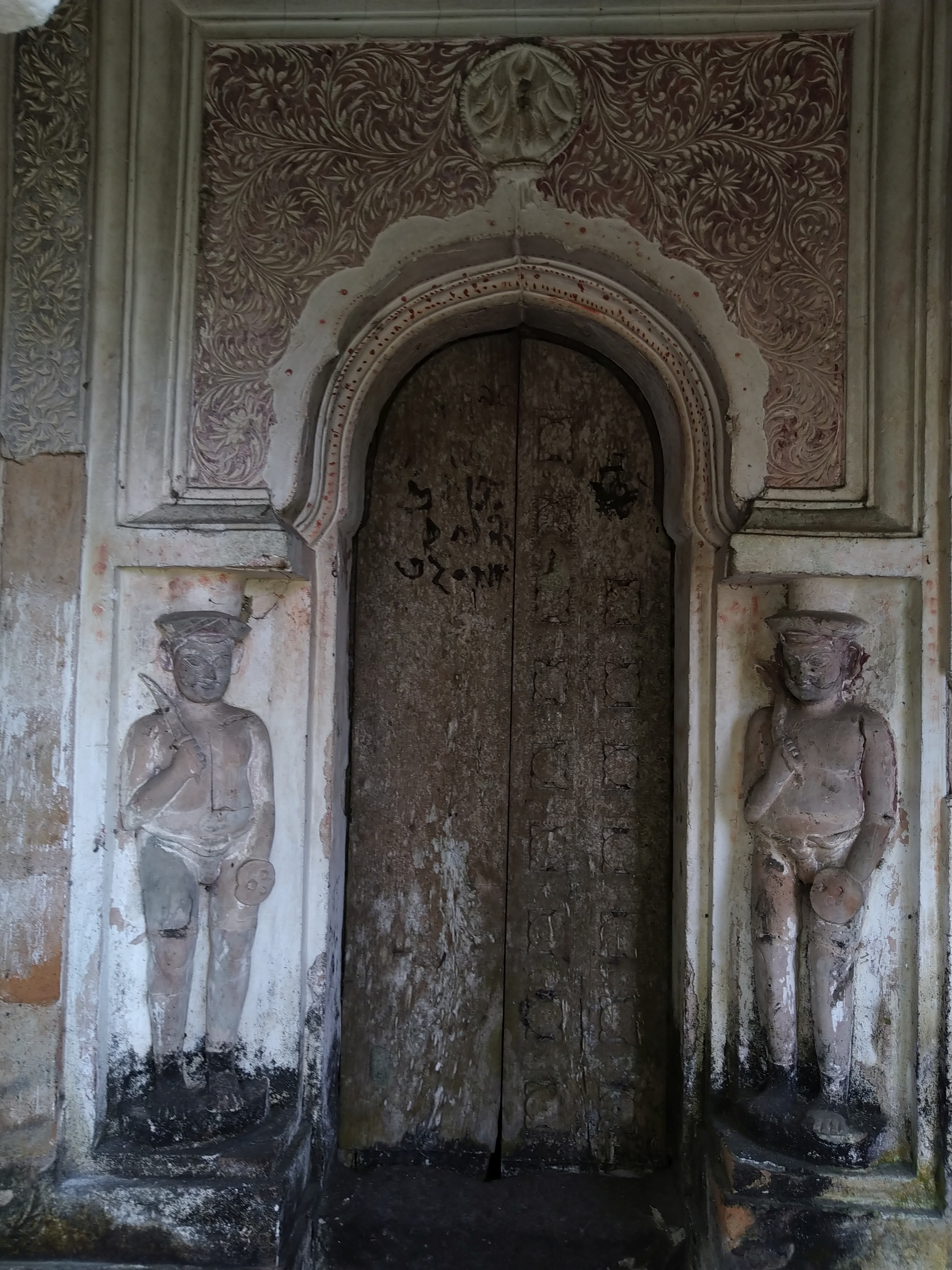
Ram Chandra temple has exquisite terracotta work

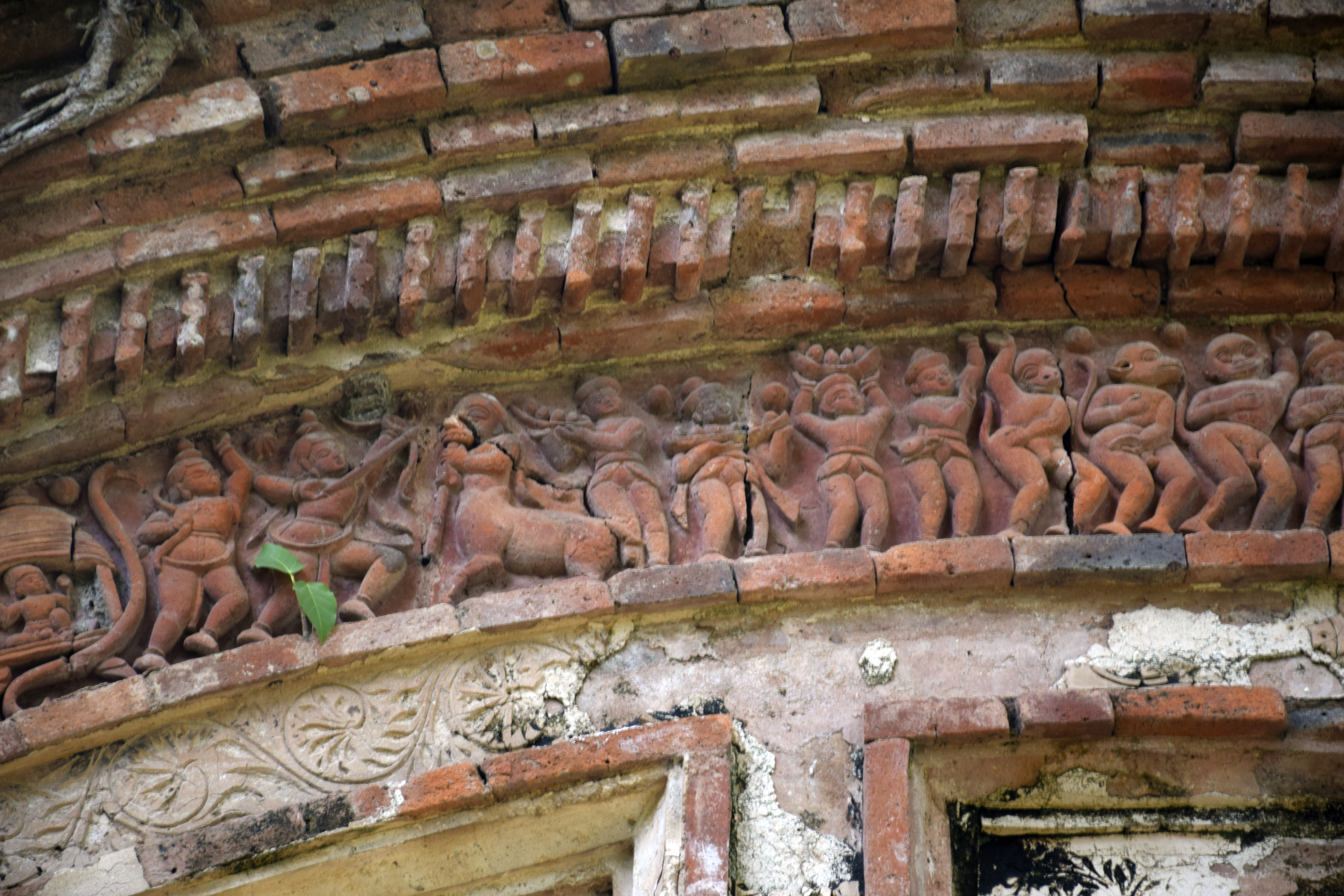
Terracotta panels

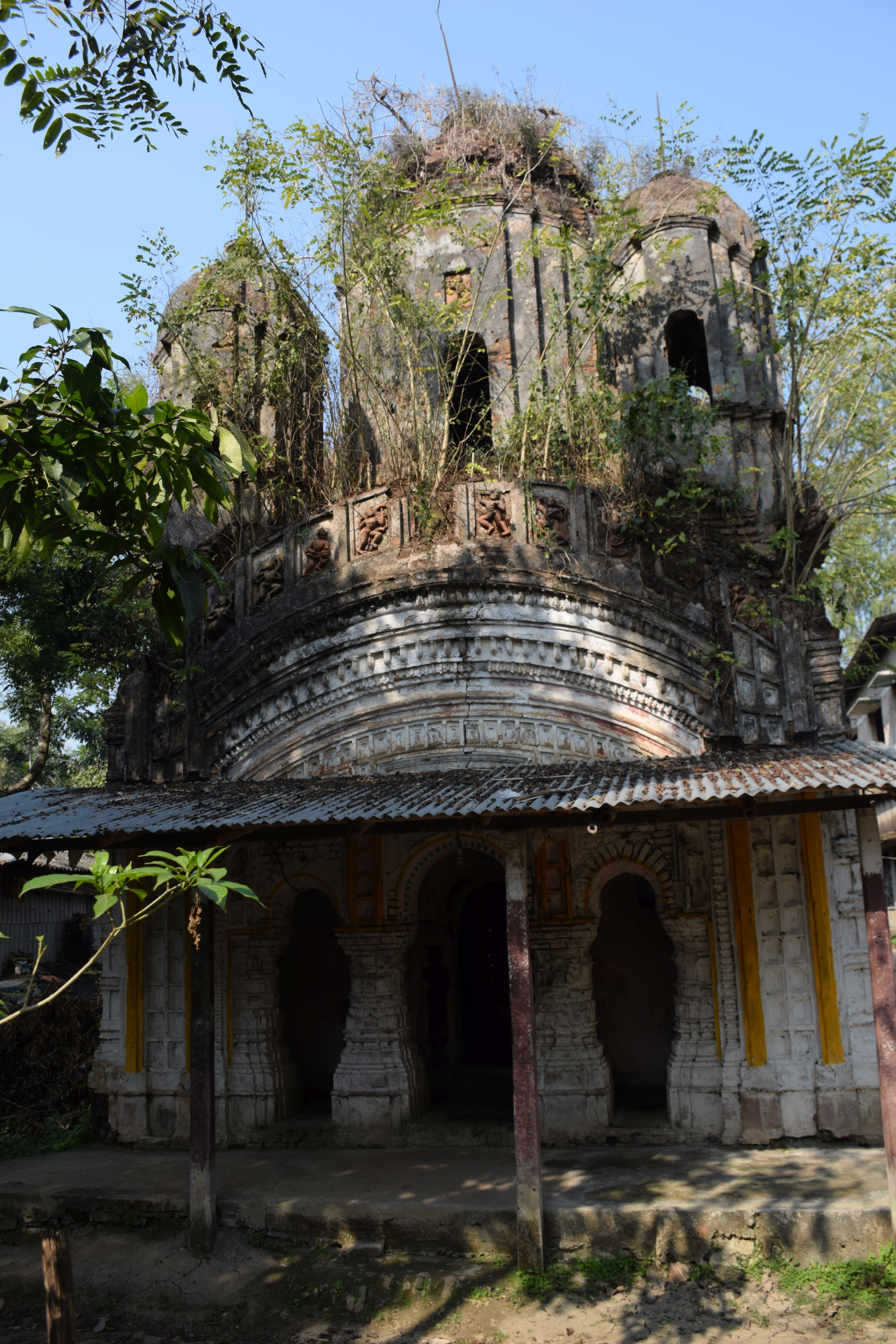
Pancha-ratna Radha Krishna temple in perilous condition

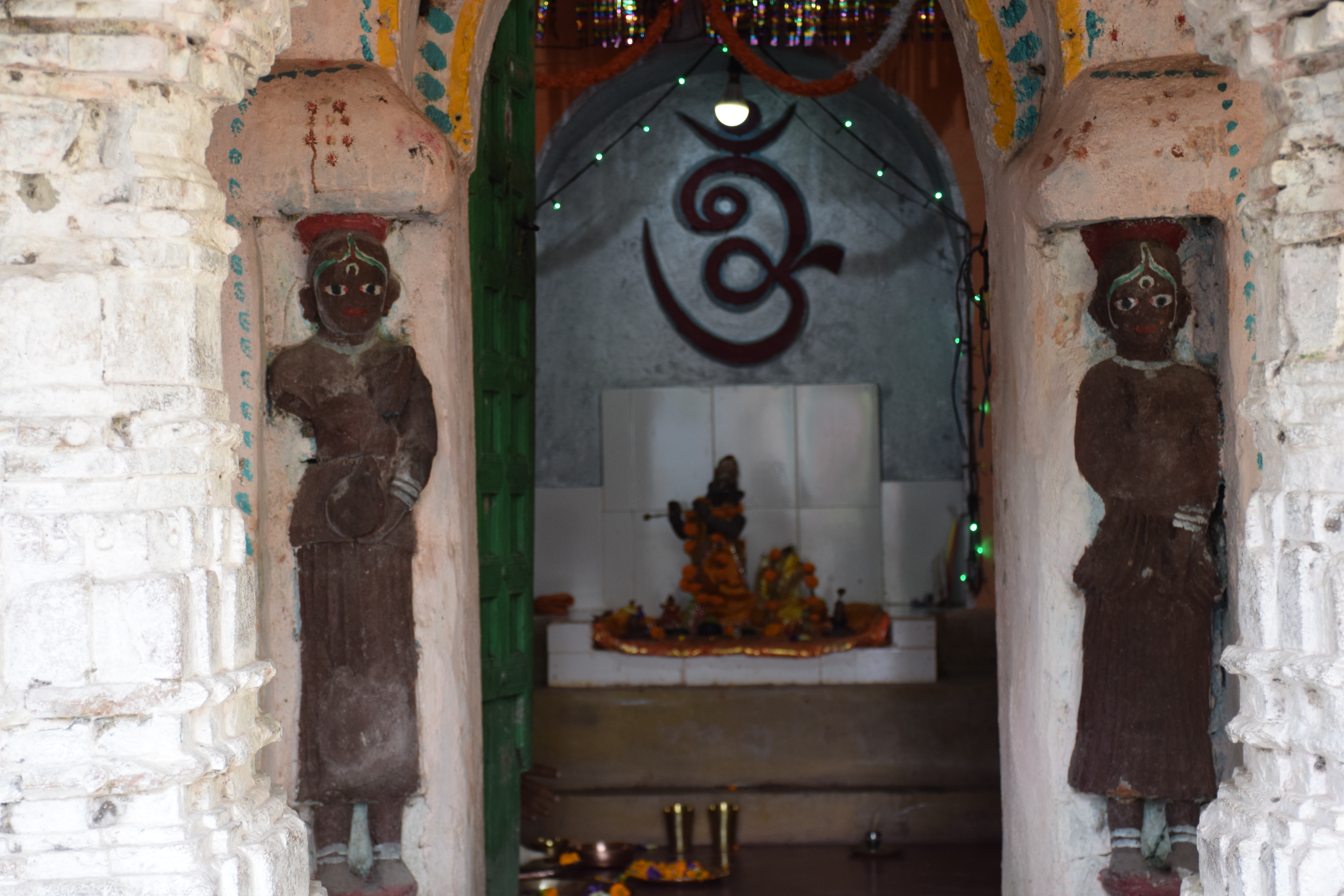
The deity in the garbhagriha

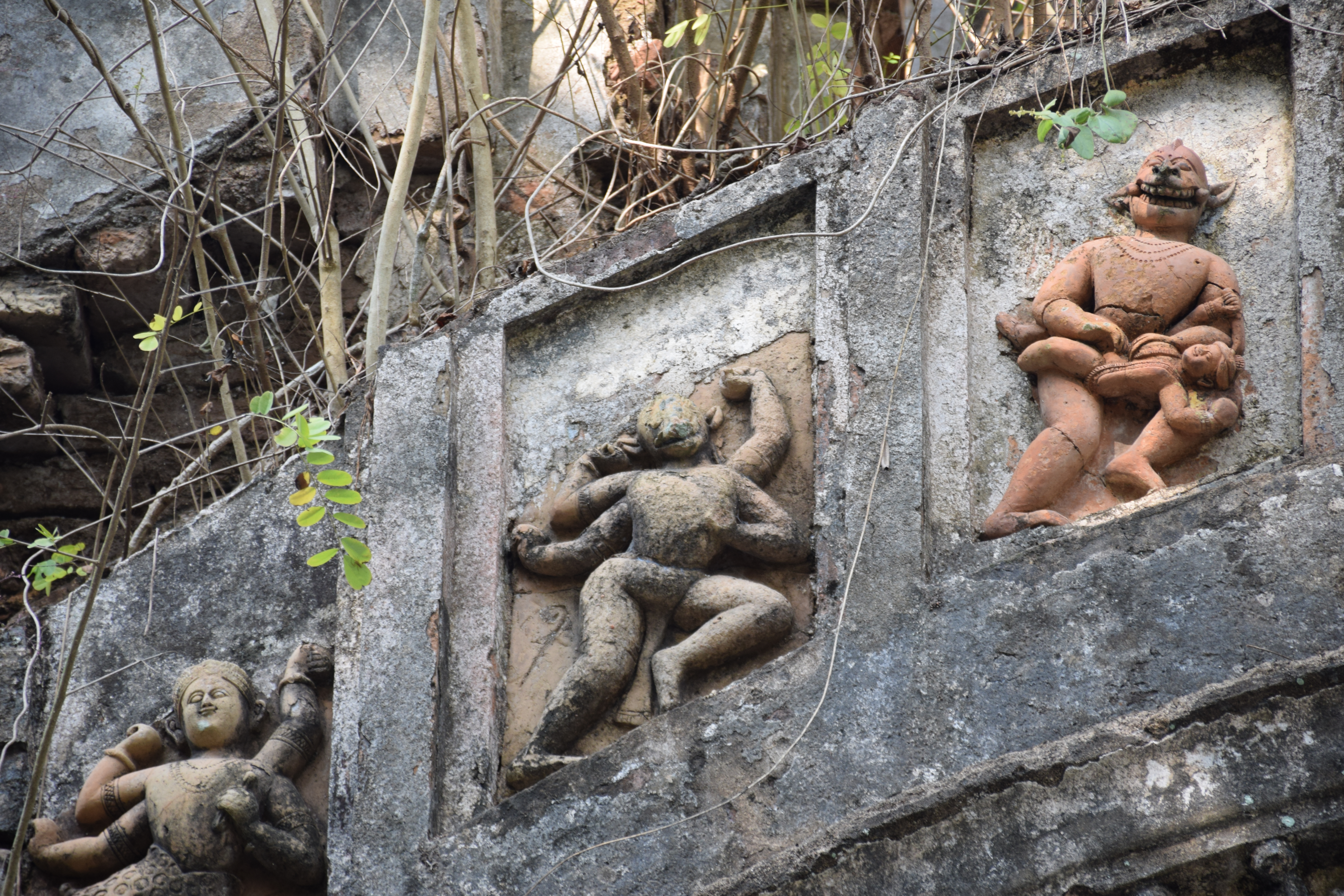
Terracotta panel

== Healthcare ==
There is a primary health centre at Jalchak, with 10 beds.
