= Panskura Lok Sabha constituency =

Former Lok Sabha Constituency in West Bengal

Coordinates: 22.4°N 87.7°E

Panskura
- Former Lok Sabha constituency

Constituency details
- Country: India
- Region: East India
- State: West Bengal
- Assembly constituencies: As of 2004: Daspur; Nandanpur; Panskura West; Sabang; Pingla; Debra; Keshpur (SC)
- Established: 1977
- Abolished: 2009
- Reservation: None

Panskura Lok Sabha constituency was one of the 543 parliamentary constituencies in India. The constituency centred on Panskura in West Bengal.

== Assembly segments ==
Prior to delimitation in 2006 Panskura Lok Sabha constituency was composed of the following assembly segments:

- Daspur (assembly constituency no. 198)
- Nandanpur (assembly constituency no. 199)
- Panskura West (assembly constituency no. 200)
- Sabang (assembly constituency no. 216)
- Pingla (assembly constituency no. 217)
- Debra (assembly constituency no. 218)
- Keshpur (SC) (assembly constituency no. 219)

As per order of the Delimitation Commission issued in 2006 in respect of the delimitation of constituencies in the West Bengal, Panskura parliamentary constituency will cease to exist; most of the assembly segments of this constituency will be part of new Ghatal Lok Sabha constituency.

== Members of Parliament ==
| Election | Member | Party |
|---|---|---|
| 1977 | Abha Maiti | Janata Party |
| 1980 | Geeta Mukherjee | Communist Party of India |
| 1984 | Geeta Mukherjee | Communist Party of India |
| 1989 | Geeta Mukherjee | Communist Party of India |
| 1991 | Geeta Mukherjee | Communist Party of India |
| 1996 | Geeta Mukherjee | Communist Party of India |
| 1998 | Geeta Mukherjee | Communist Party of India |
| 1999 | Geeta Mukherjee | Communist Party of India |
| 2000^ | Bikram Sarkar | Trinamool Congress |
| 2004 | Gurudas Dasgupta | Communist Party of India |

For Members of Parliament from the area during the period 1951-1977 and 2009 onwards, see Ghatal Lok Sabha constituency

== Election results ==
Most of the contests were multi-cornered. However, only winners and runners-up are mentioned below:

| Year | Winner | | Runner-up | |
| | Candidate | Party | Candidate | Party |
| 1977 | Abha Maiti | Janata Party | Phulrenu Guha | Indian National Congress |
| 1980 | Geeta Mukherjee | Communist Party of India | Rajani Kanta Dolai | Indian National Congress (I) |
| 1984 | Geeta Mukherjee | Communist Party of India | Chittaranjan Chakraborty | Indian National Congress |
| 1989 | Geeta Mukherjee | Communist Party of India | Chittaranjan Chakraborty | Indian National Congress |
| 1991 | Geeta Mukherjee | Communist Party of India | Sudhanshu Bhowmik | Indian National Congress |
| 1996 | Geeta Mukherjee | Communist Party of India | Padma Khastgir | Indian National Congress |
| 1998 | Geeta Mukherjee | Communist Party of India | Saumen Mahapatra | West Bengal Trinamool Congress |
| 1999 | Geeta Mukherjee | Communist Party of India | Gouri Ghosh | All India Trinamool Congress |
| 2000(Bye-Election) | Bikram Sarkar | All India Trinamool Congress | Gurudas Dasgupta | Communist Party of India |
| 2004 | Gurudas Dasgupta | Communist Party of India | Hema Choubey | All India Trinamool Congress |

Ghatal Lok Sabha constituency functioned from 1951 to 1971.

=== 2004 ===
General Election, 2004: Panskura
| Party | Candidate | Votes | % | ±% |
|---|---|---|---|---|
| CPI | Gurudas Dasgupta | 541,513 | 61.92 | |
| AITC | Hema Choubey | 262,035 | 29.82 | |
| INC | Nazim Ahmed | 71,006 | 8.01 | |
| Majority | | 279,478 | 32.10 | |
| Turnout | | 8,74,554 | 86.35 | |
| CPI gain from AITC | | Swing | | |

=== 2000 bye-election ===
In the Panskura seat, the by-election was held due to the death of the sitting CPI-MP Geeta Mukherjee on 4 March 2000. The bye election held on 5 June 2000. Bikram Sarkar of Trinamool Congress defeated Gurudas Dasgupta of the CPI by 41,491 votes.

Indian Parliamentary bye election, 2000: Panskura constituency
| Party | Candidate | Votes | % | ±% |
|---|---|---|---|---|
| AITC | Bikram Sarkar | 426,779 | 50.73 | +7.28 |
| CPI | Gurudas Dasgupta | 385,298 | 45.80 | −3.40 |
| INC | Subhankar Sarkar | 20,497 | 2.44 | −22.07 |
| Independent | Sk. Hafijur Rahaman | 5,008 | 0.15 | 6.74 |
| Independent | Sk. Maksud Hossain | 3,622 | 0.43 | |
| Majority | | 41,491 | 3.83 | |
| Turnout | | 96,650 | 47.69 | −6.7 |
| AITC gain from CPI | | Swing | +21.27 | |

=== General election 1999 ===
1999 Indian general election: Panskura
| Party | Candidate | Votes | % | ±% |
|---|---|---|---|---|
| CPI | Geeta Mukherjee | 401,431 | 49.19 | −5.68 |
| AITC | Gouri Ghosh | 354,573 | 43.45 | +10.95 |
| INC | Rajani Kanta Dolai | 65,147 | 7.39 | −4.81 |
| Independent | Ajit Mallick | 979 | 0.12 | +1.97 |
| Majority | | 46,858 | 5.74 | |
| Turnout | | 8,16,130 | 83.55 | |
| CPI hold | | Swing | | |

=== General election 1998 ===
1998 Indian general election: Panskura
| Party | Candidate | Votes | % | ±% |
|---|---|---|---|---|
| CPI | Geeta Mukherjee | 450,092 | 54.88 | |
| Trinamool Congress | Dr. Soumen Mahapatra | 270,549 | 33.00 | |
| INC | Sandhya De | 99,439 | 12.00 | |
| Majority | | 179,543 | 21.88 | |
| Turnout | | 8,20,080 | 85.99 | |
| CPI hold | | Swing | | |

=== General election 1996 ===
1996 Indian general election: Panskura
| Party | Candidate | Votes | % | ±% |
|---|---|---|---|---|
| CPI | Geeta Mukherjee | 455,424 | 54.82 | |
| INC | Padma Khastgir | 360,026 | 41.41 | |
| BJP | Amitabh Nayak | 15,563 | 1.87 | |
| Independent | Durgapada Hansda | 9,265 | 1.12 | |
| Independent | Rabindra Kumar Ghosh | 3,794 | 0.46 | |
| Independent | Purshottam Upaddhay | 930 | 0.11 | |
| AMB | Subhash Prakash Pal | 891 | 0.11 | |
| IUML | Sk. Manoray Ali | 824 | 0.10 | |
| Majority | | 95,398 | | |
| Turnout | | 8,30,707 | 89.88 | |
| CPI hold | | Swing | | |

=== General election 1991 ===
1991 Indian general election: Panskura
| Party | Candidate | Votes | % | ±% |
|---|---|---|---|---|
| CPI | Geeta Mukherjee | 391,509 | 54.96 | |
| INC | Sudhansu Bhowmik | 265,209 | 37.23 | |
| BJP | Pannalal Bhattacharya | 42,059 | 5.90 | |
| Independent | Manik Maity | 4,121 | 0.58 | |
| JP | Jagdiswar Panja | 3,874 | 0.54 | |
| Independent | Mukesh Maity | 1,708 | 0.24 | |
| Independent | Rabindra Kumar Ghosh | 1,328 | 0.19 | |
| IC(S) | Sikari Dhobey | 1,278 | 0.18 | |
| Independent | Purusottamlal Upaddhyay | 1,203 | 0.17 | |
| Majority | | 126,300 | | |
| Turnout | | 8,20,080 | 85.99 | |
| CPI hold | | Swing | | |

=== General election 1989 ===
1989 Indian general election: Panskura
| Party | Candidate | Votes | % | ±% |
|---|---|---|---|---|
| CPI | Geeta Mukherjee | 422,979 | 58.11 | |
| INC | Chittaranjan Chakraborty | 296,628 | 40.76 | |
| Jharkhand Party | Kalipada Murmu | 3,984 | 0.55 | |
| JMM | Kanailal Ghorai | 3,659 | 0.50 | |
| Independent | Jagat Shaw | 558 | 0.08 | |
| Majority | | 126,351 | | |
| Turnout | | 7,27,759 | 85.28 | |
| CPI hold | | Swing | | |

=== General election 1984 ===
1984 Indian general election: Panskura
| Party | Candidate | Votes | % | ±% |
|---|---|---|---|---|
| CPI | Geeta Mukherjee | 321,694 | 53.63 | |
| INC | Chittaranjan Chakraborty | 273,818 | 45.65 | |
| ABJS | Jagadiswar Panja | 2,115 | 0.35 | |
| Independent | Dubraj Saren | 1,874 | 0.31 | |
| Independent | Shikari Dhoby | 383 | 0.06 | |
| Majority | | 47,876 | | |
| Turnout | | 5,99,884 | 85.70 | |
| CPI hold | | Swing | | |

=== General election 1980 ===
1980 Indian general election: Panskura
| Party | Candidate | Votes | % | ±% |
|---|---|---|---|---|
| CPI | Geeta Mukherjee | 296,528 | 57.10 | |
| INC(I) | Rajani Kanta Dolai | 198,298 | 37.86 | |
| INC(U) | Phulrenu Guha | 188,195 | 34.95 | |
| JP | Abha Maiti | 23,997 | 4.70 | |
| JP(S) | Saswati Prasad Bag | 1,713 | 0.34 | |
| Turnout | | 98,230 | | |
| Turnout | | 5,10,536 | 83.96 | |
| CPI gain from JP | | Swing | | |

=== General election 1977 ===
1977 Indian general election: Panskura
| Party | Candidate | Votes | % | ±% |
|---|---|---|---|---|
| JP | Abha Maiti | 230,704 | 63.51% | |
| INC | Phulrenu Guha | 132,567 | 36.49% | |
| Majority | | 98,137 | | |
| Turnout | | 3,63,271 | 71.78% | |
| JP win (new seat) | | | | |

== See also ==
- List of constituencies of the Lok Sabha
