= K. L. Mahendra =

Indian trade union leader (1922–2007)

K. L. Mahendra (November 1922 – 12 August 2007) was an Indian trade union leader.

Born in Hyderabad, Mahendra attended Osmania University, where he took part in the Vandemataram strike. He then moved to study at Visva-Bharati University, and finally in Burdwan. In 1942, he joined the Communist Party of India (CPI), which encouraged him to become a trade unionist. He organised unions in Burnpur and Asansol before returning to Hyderabad. He went underground to participate in the Telangana Rebellion, and spent some time in prison in the early 1950s.

In 1970, Mahendra was elected to the Andhra Pradesh Legislative Assembly, serving until 1982. In 1984, he was elected as president of the Singareni Collieries Workers Union. From 1996 until 2001, he served as general secretary of the All India Trade Union Congress. He also served on the national executive of the CPI from 1997 until 2004, and from 2000 until 2005 was the president of the World Federation of Trade Unions.

Trade union offices
Preceded by Ardhendu Bhushan Bardhan	General Secretary of the All India Trade Union Congress; 1996–2001	Succeeded by Gurudas Dasgupta
Preceded by Antonio Neto	President of the World Federation of Trade Unions; 2000–2005	Succeeded by Shaban Assouz
