= A. B. Bardhan =

Former General secretary of the Communist party of India

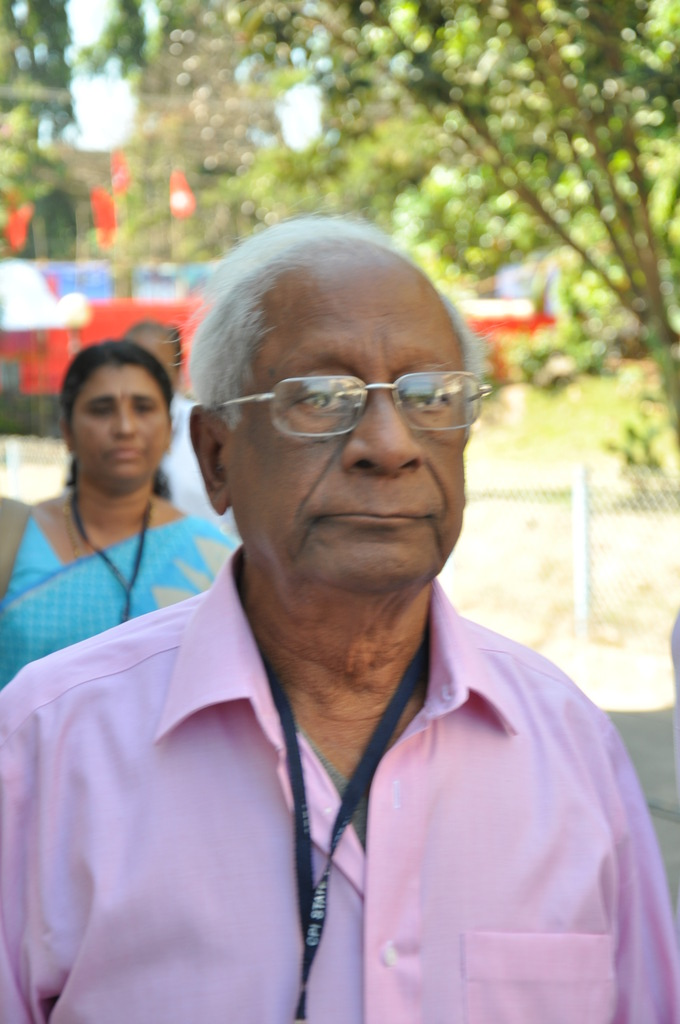

General Secretary of the Communist Party of India
- In office 1996–2012
- Preceded by: Indrajit Gupta
- Succeeded by: Suravaram Sudhakar Reddy

Member of the Bombay Legislative Assembly
- In office 1957–1962
- Preceded by: Post established
- Succeeded by: Sushila Balraj
- Constituency: Nagpur

Personal details
- Born: 24 September 1924 Barisal, Bengal Presidency, British India
- Died: 2 January 2016 (aged 91) Delhi, India
- Party: Communist Party of India
- Spouse: Padma
- Education: Nagpur University
- Profession: Politician, social worker

Ardhendu Bhushan Bardhan (24 September 1924 – 2 January 2016) was a trade union leader and the former general secretary of the Communist Party of India (CPI), one of the oldest political parties in India.

== Early life ==
Bardhan was born in Barisal, Bengal Presidency, British India (now Bangladesh) on 24 September 1924. He embraced Communism at the age of 15 after he moved to Nagpur. He joined the All India Students Federation at the Nagpur University in 1940. He joined the Communist Party of India (which was then banned), the same year. He served as the President of the Nagpur University Students' Union. He became a full-time student organizer, while continuing his studies, and in 1945 he was elected the Secretary of AISF. Bardhan held a postgraduate degree in economics and a degree in law.

== Trade unionism and politics ==
Bardhan worked with workers ranging from various sectors like textile, electricity, railways, defence etc. He contested several elections from Nagpur but was elected only once to the Maharashtra Legislative Assembly in 1957 as an independent candidate. He was also instrumental in the integration of Maharashtra that led to its creation on 1 May 1960.

Bardhan entered national politics and moved to Delhi. He became the General Secretary of the All India Trade Union Congress in 1994 and became the Deputy General Secretary of the Communist Party of India in 1995.

When Indrajit Gupta joined the United Front government as the Minister of Home Affairs (India), Bardhan succeeded him as the General Secretary of the Communist Party of India following Gupta's resignation from the post of party's General Secretary. Bardhan served as the party's General Secretary from 1996 to 2012.

He is remembered for the campaign he initiated in response to Lal Krishna Advani's Rath Yatra. Bardhan always supported the cause of a secular India.

Bardhan played a key role in the formation of the United Progressive Alliance government which was supported by the Communist Party of India. Bardhan was also among those who supported the candidature of Pratibha Patil, then Governor of Rajasthan, to the coveted post of the President of India.

== Personal life ==
Bardhan married Padma, who was a teacher in Saraswati Vidyalaya Higher Secondary School, Shankar Nagar, Nagpur. They got a son Ashok and a daughter Alka Barua. Padma died in 1986. After her death, Bardhan spent his life in a small room at Ajoy Bhavan, the headquarters of CPI in Delhi. Bardhan was fluent in Marathi, Bengali, Urdu, Hindi and English languages. Bardhan had a brother-like relation with the veteran Bharatiya Janata Party leader Sumatitai Sukaklikar from Nagpur. Although they contested elections against each other, Sumatitai was like an elder sister to Bardhan.

=== Death ===
Bardhan suffered a paralytic stroke in December 2015. He was admitted to the hospital. He died, aged 91, on 2 January 2016 at the Govind Ballabh Pant Hospital in New Delhi.

His death was condoled by many including the President of India Pranab Mukherjee, Prime Minister of India Narendra Modi and Congress President Sonia Gandhi.

== Works ==
A.B. Bardhan wrote many books, such as:

- Debate on reservation
- Class, Caste Reservation & Struggle Against Casteism
- 80 CPI
- Generalists, specialists and the working class
- The tribal problem in India
- India's Freedom Struggle: Several Streams
- Hutatma Bhagat Singh
- Prejudices & myths that feed communalism x-rayed
- Reforms 2020: Last 20 Years, Next 20 Years

== See also ==
- Gopal Mukund Huddar

Trade union offices
Preceded by Homi F. Daji	General Secretary of the All India Trade Union Congress; 1996–1996	Succeeded by K. L. Mahendra
