= Keshpur Assembly constituency =

Keshpur
- Constituency No. 235 for the West Bengal Legislative Assembly
- Interactive Map Outlining Keshpur Assembly Constituency

Constituency details
- Country: India
- Region: East India
- State: West Bengal
- District: Paschim Medinipur
- Lok Sabha constituency: Ghatal
- Established: 1951
- Total electors: 194,412
- Reservation: SC

Member of Legislative Assembly
- 18th West Bengal Legislative Assembly
- Incumbent Seuli Saha
- Party: DTC
- Elected year: 2026

Keshpur is an assembly constituency in Paschim Medinipur district in the Indian state of West Bengal. It is reserved for scheduled castes.

== Overview ==
As per orders of the Delimitation Commission, No. 235 Keshpur Assembly constituency (SC) is composed of the following: Keshpur community development block.

Keshpur Assembly constituency is part of No. 32 Ghatal (Lok Sabha constituency). It Was Earlier Part of Panskura (Lok Sabha constituency) till 2009.

== Members of the Legislative Assembly ==
Year	Name	Party
1951	Nagendra Doloi	Communist Party of India
1951	Gangapada Kuor	Kisan Mazdoor Praja Party
1957	No seat	
1962	Bankim Roy	Indian National Congress
1967	Rajani Kanta Dolai	Indian National Congress
1969	Gangapada Kuar	Bangla Congress
1971	Rajani Kanta Dolai	Indian National Congress
1972	Rajani Kanta Dolai	Indian National Congress
1977	Rajani Kanta Dolai	Indian National Congress
1982	Himanshu Kumar	Communist Party of India (Marxist)
1987	Himanshu Kumar	Communist Party of India (Marxist)
1991	Nanda Rani Dal	Communist Party of India (Marxist)
1996	Nanda Rani Dal	Communist Party of India (Marxist)
2001	Nanda Rani Dal	Communist Party of India (Marxist)
2006	Rameswar Doloi	Communist Party of India (Marxist)
2011	Rameswar Doloi	Communist Party of India (Marxist)
2016	Seuli Saha	All India Trinamool Congress
2021	Seuli Saha	All India Trinamool Congress
2026	Seuli Saha	All India Trinamool Congress

== Election results ==
=== 2026 ===
Detailed Results at: https://results.eci.gov.in/ResultAcGenMay2026/candidateswise-S25235.htm

2026 West Bengal Legislative Assembly election: Keshpur
Party	Candidate	Votes	%	±%
AITC	Seuli Saha	143,123	56.36	▲5.55
BJP	Suvendu Samanta	93,018	36.63	▼5.19
CPI(M)	Gurupada Mondal	10,432	4.11	▼1.83
NOTA	None of the above	1,553	0.61	▼0.82
Majority		50,105	19.73	▲10.74
Turnout		253,963	94.69	▲6.66
AITC hold		Swing		

=== 2021 ===
West Bengal assembly elections, 2021: Keshpur(SC)
Party	Candidate	Votes	%	±%
AITC	Seuli Saha	116,992	50.81	
BJP	Pritish Ranjan Kuar	96,272	41.82	
CPI(M)	Rameshwar Doloi	13,670	5.94	
NOTA	None of the above	3,298	1.43	
Majority		20,720	8.99	
Turnout		230,232	88.03	
AITC hold		Swing		

=== 2016 ===
In the 2016 election, Seuli Saha of Trinamool Congress defeated his nearest rival Rameswar Dolui of CPI(M).

West Bengal assembly elections, 2016: Keshpur(SC)
Party	Candidate	Votes	%	±%
AITC	Seuli Saha	146,579	72.90%	
CPI(M)	Rameswar Doloi	45,428	22.60%	
BJP	Dipak Patra	9,073	4.50%	
Majority		101,151		
Turnout		2,01,080	92.82	
AITC gain from CPI(M)		Swing	-21.24	

.# Swing calculated on Congress+Trinamool Congress vote percentages taken together in 2006.

=== 2011 ===
In the 2011 election, Rameswar Dolui of CPI(M) defeated his nearest rival Rajani Kanta Dolui of Congress.

West Bengal assembly elections, 2011: Keshpur(SC)
Party	Candidate	Votes	%	±%
CPI(M)	Rameswar Doloi	103,903	57.58	−12.87
INC	Rajani Kanta Doloi	70,059	38.82	+9.27#
BJP	Dipak Patra	6,496	3.60	
Turnout		180,456	92.82	
Majority		33.853		
CPI(M) hold		Swing	-21.24	

.# Swing calculated on Congress+Trinamool Congress vote percentages taken together in 2011.

=== 2006 ===
In the 2006 state assembly elections, Rameswar Doloi of CPI(M) won the Keshpur (SC) assembly seat defeating his nearest rival Asish Pramanik of Trinamool Congress. Contests in most years were multi cornered but only winners and runners are being mentioned. Nanda Rani Dal of CPI(M) defeated Rajani Kanta Doloi of Trinamool Congress in 2001, Sannyasi Dolai of Congress in 1996, and Balai Chandra Parija of Jharkhand Party in 1991. Himansu Kumar of CPI(M) defeated Rajani Kanta Doloi of Congress in 1987 and 1982. Rajani Kanta Doloi of Congress defeated Ajoy Kumar Dolui of CPI(M) in 1977.

=== 2001 ===
In the 2001 election, Nanda Rani Dal of CPI(M) defeated his nearest rival Rajani Kanta Doloi of Trinamool Congress.

West Bengal assembly elections, 2001: Keshpur(SC)
Party	Candidate	Votes	%	±%
CPI(M)	Nanda Rani Dal	120,566	90.60%	
AITC	Rajani Kanta Doloi	12,454	9.40%	
Turnout		1,33,032	(85.5%)	
Majority		108,112	(81.3%)	
CPI(M) hold		Swing		

.# Swing calculated on Congress+Trinamool Congress vote percentages taken together in 2001.

=== 1996 ===
In the 1996 election, Nanda Rani Dal of CPI(M) defeated his nearest rival Sannyasi Dolai of Congress.

West Bengal assembly elections, 1996: Keshpur(SC)
Party	Candidate	Votes	%	±%
CPI(M)	Nanda Rani Dal	83,846	65.10%	
INC	Sannyasi Dolai	40,376	31.30%	
BJP	Nanda Ram Bhuinya	3,232	2.50%	
Independent	Laksmi Kanta Banti	1,406	1.10%	
Turnout		1,31,860	(91.9%)	
Majority		43,470	(33.0%)	
CPI(M) hold		Swing		

.# Swing calculated on Congress+Trinamool Congress vote percentages taken together in 2001.

=== 1991 ===
In the 1991 election, Nanda Rani Dal of CPI(M) defeated his nearest rival Balai Chandra Paria of Jharkhand Party.

West Bengal assembly elections, 1991: Keshpur(SC)
Party	Candidate	Votes	%	±%
CPI(M)	Nanda Rani Dal	69,499	66.80%	
Jharkhand Party	Balai Chandra Paria	30,575	29.40%	
BJP	Dhurjati Parmanik	4,034	3.90%	
Turnout		1,06,241	(82.2%)	
Majority		38,924	(36.6%)	
CPI(M) hold		Swing		

.# Swing calculated on Congress+Trinamool Congress vote percentages taken together in 2001.

=== 1987 ===
In the 1987 election, Himangshu Kumar of CPI(M) defeated his nearest rival Rajani Kanta Dolai of Congress.

West Bengal assembly elections, 1987: Keshpur(SC)
Party	Candidate	Votes	%	±%
CPI(M)	Himangshu Kumar	55,775	56.20%	
INC	Rajani Kanta Dolai	42,549	42.90%	
Independent	Bhutunath Dolai	576	0.60%	
Independent	Khandu Ram Dhal	314	0.30%	
Turnout		1,00,429	(87.2%)	
Majority		13,226	(13.2%)	
CPI(M) hold		Swing		

.# Swing calculated on Congress+Trinamool Congress vote percentages taken together in 2001.

=== 1982 ===
In the 1982 election, Himangshu Kumar of CPI(M) defeated his nearest rival Rajani Kanta Dolai of Congress.

West Bengal assembly elections, 1982: Keshpur(SC)
Party	Candidate	Votes	%	±%
CPI(M)	Himangshu Kumar	48,868	55.90%	
INC	Rajani Kanta Dolai	37,473	42.90%	
Independent	Prabhat Patra	1,014	1.20%	
Turnout		88,392	(90.3%)	
Majority		11,395	(12.9%)	
CPI(M) gain from INC		Swing		

.# Swing calculated on Congress+Trinamool Congress vote percentages taken together in 2001.

=== 1977 ===
In the 1982 election, Rajanai Kanta Dolui of Congress defeated his nearest rival Ajoy Kumar Dolui of CPIM.

West Bengal assembly elections, 1977: Keshpur(SC)
Party	Candidate	Votes	%	±%
INC	Rajani Kanta Dolai	20,210	40.20%	
CPI(M)	Ajoy Kumar Dolui	12,737	25.30%	
JP	Gangapada Kuar	11,596	23.00%	
CPI	Subal Dolui	7,591	11.50%	
Turnout		51,090	(64.9%)	
Majority		7,473	(14.6%)	
INC hold		Swing		

.# Swing calculated on Congress+Trinamool Congress vote percentages taken together in 2001.

=== 1972 ===
Rajani Kanta Doloi of Congress won in 1972 and 1971. Gangapada Kuar of Bangla Congress won in 1969. Rajani Kanta Doloi of Congress won in 1967. Bankim Roy of Congress won in 1962. The Keshpur seat did not exist in 1957. In independent India's first election in 1951, Nagendra Doloi of CPI won the Keshpur seat.
