= Bikram Sarkar =

Indian politician

Member of Parliament, Lok Sabha
- In office 8 June 2000 - 13 May 2004
- Preceded by: Geeta Mukherjee
- Succeeded by: Gurudas Dasgupta
- Constituency: Panskura, West Bengal
- In office 12 March 1998 - 28 April 1999
- Preceded by: Priyaranjan Dasmunsi
- Succeeded by: Swadesh Chakraborty
- Constituency: Howrah, West Bengal

Personal details
- Born: 7 April 1939 (age 87) Jiaganj, Bengal Province, British India (present-day West Bengal, India)
- Party: Bharatiya Janata Party (2014–present)
- Other political affiliations: Trinamool Congress

Bikram Sarkar is an Indian politician. He was elected to the Lok Sabha, the lower house of Indian parliament from Howrah in 1998 and from Panskura in 2000 in a by election as a candidate of the Trinamool Congress.
