= Abha Maiti =

Indian politician (1925–1994)

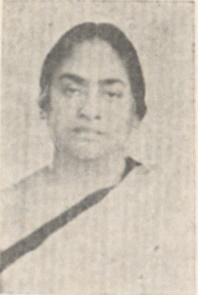

Minister of State for Industry
- In office 12 August 1977 – 1979
- Prime Minister: Morarji Desai

Minister of Refugee and Social Welfare, Government of West Bengal
- In office 1962–1967

Member of Parliament, Rajya Sabha
- In office 3 April 1960 – 4 March 1962

Member of Parliament
- In office 1977–1980
- Preceded by: Constituency established
- Succeeded by: Geeta Mukherjee
- Constituency: Panskura

Member of the Legislative Assembly
- In office 1952–1957 Serving with Koustav Kanti Karan
- Preceded by: Constituency established
- Succeeded by: Abanti Kumar Das
- Constituency: Khejuri
- In office 1962–1969
- Preceded by: Basanta Kumar Panda; Bhikhari Mondal
- Succeeded by: Prasanta Kumar Pradhan
- Constituency: Bhagabanpur

Personal details
- Born: 22 April 1925 Kalicharanpur, Midnapore, Bengal Presidency, British India
- Died: 3 July 1994 (aged 69)
- Party: Janata Party
- Other political affiliations: Bharatiya Lok Dal; Indian National Congress
- Parents: Nikunja Behari Maiti (father); Ahalya Maiti (mother)

Abha Maiti (22 April 1925 – 3 July 1994) was a former Indian politician. She was the minister of state for industry in the Morarji Desai government from 1977 to 1979.

== Early life ==
Abha Maiti was born in Purba Midnapore in a Mahishya family. Her father was a freedom fighter and politician Nikunja Bihari Maiti, who was the first Education minister and refugee rehabilitation minister of West Bengal. She obtained B.A degree from Bethune College and did LL.B and M.A from University of Calcutta.

== Career ==
She was elected to the West Bengal Legislative Assembly from Khejuri (Vidhan Sabha constituency) in 1951 and from Bhagabanpur (Vidhan Sabha constituency) in 1962, 1967 and 1969. Between 1960 and 1962, Maiti was a member of the Rajya Sabha. She was the refugee rehabilitation minister of West Bengal from 1962 to 1967.

She was elected to Lok Sabha in 1977 from Panskura in West Bengal on the Janata Party ticket.
