= Biplobi Bangla Congress =

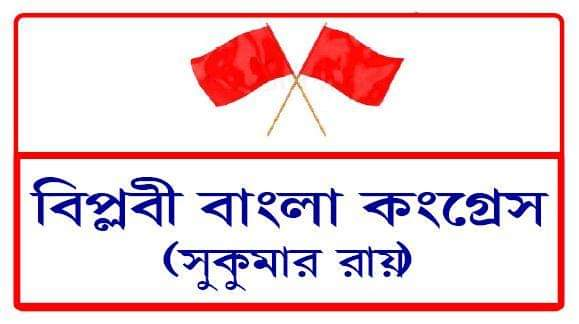
- Founder: Sukumar Roy
- Founded: 1971 (55 years ago)
- Split from: Bangla Congress
- Political position: Left-wing
- National affiliation: Left Front
- Colours: Red; Purple

Biplobi Bangla Congress (BBC; transl. Revolutionary Bangla Congress) is a political party in West Bengal, India. The party emerged as a splinter group of the Bangla Congress party ahead of the 1971 West Bengal elections. The party was founded by Sukumar Roy, a prominent member of Bangla Congress. It is a part of the Left Front.

== Electoral history ==
BBC candidate Tushar Kanti Laya contested the Sabang seat in West Midnapore for 2001 assembly elections of the state and won it. In the 2006 assembly elections of West Bengal, BBC again contested the Sabang seat with Tushar Kanti Laya as its candidate (on a Communist Party of India (Marxist) symbol). Laya got 62,079 votes (44.98%), but lost the seat to Congress candidate Dr. Manas Bhunia. BBC again contested the Sabang seat in 2011 assembly elections and in 2017-by elections but lost both times.

== Prominent members ==
Some prominent leaders of Biplobi Bangla Congress are Nirmalendu Bhattacharya, Gouranga Samanta, Ashis Chowdhury, Sunil Chowdhury, Deepak Senroy (Subrata Roy). Gouranga Samanta was elected as MLA two times from Sabang. Other MLAs were Dr. Makhan Lal Bangal, Tushar Laya. Dr. Umesh Chaudhary & Reeta Chowdhury were Councillor in Kolkata Municipal Corporation at different times.
