= Amal Kumar Panda =

Indian politician (born 1954)

Member of the West Bengal Legislative Assembly
- Incumbent
- Assumed office 4 May 2026
- Preceded by: Manas Ranjan Bhunia
- Constituency: Sabang

Personal details
- Party: Bharatiya Janata Party
- Profession: Politician

Amal Kumar Panda (born 1954) is an Indian politician from West Bengal. He is a member of the West Bengal Legislative Assembly from the Sabang Assembly constituency in Paschim Medinipur district representing the Bharatiya Janata Party.

== Early life and education ==
Panda is from Sabang, Paschim Medinipur district, West Bengal. He is the son of the late Sudhir Panda. He completed his Class 12 at Jalchak NN Vidyatan in 1973. He is into cultivation. He declared assets worth Rs.78 lakhs in his affidavit to the Election Commission of India.

== Career ==
Panda won the Sabang Assembly constituency representing the Bharatiya Janata Party in the 2026 West Bengal Legislative Assembly election. He polled 1,27,783 votes and defeated his nearest rival and sitting MLA, Manas Bhunia of the All India Trinamool Congress, by a margin of 11,136 votes.
