= Geeta Mukherjee =

Indian politician

Geeta Mukherjee MP

Member of Parliament, Lok Sabha
- In office 16 January 1980 – 4 March 2000
- Preceded by: Abha Maiti
- Succeeded by: Bikram Sarkar
- Constituency: Panskura

Member of West Bengal Legislative Assembly
- In office 1967–1977
- Preceded by: Rajani Kanta Pramanik
- Succeeded by: Swadesh Ranjan Maji
- Constituency: Panskura East

Personal details
- Born: Geeta Roy Chowdhury; 8 January 1924 Calcutta, Bengal Presidency, British India
- Died: 4 March 2000 (aged 76) New Delhi, India
- Party: Communist Party of India
- Spouse: Biswanath Mukherjee
- Children: Bhagabat Jana
- Relatives: Madhumita Jana (Grandchildren)
- Education: University of Calcutta; Ashutosh College (B.A.)
- Profession: Politician, social worker, writer

Geeta Mukherjee (8 January 1924 – 4 March 2000) was an Indian politician and social worker and a four times MLA from Panskura Purba, from 1967 to 1977. As a Member of Parliament, she was elected seven times from the Panskura constituency, from 1980 to 2000, in the Indian state of West Bengal being a Communist Party of India (CPI) candidate. She also remained the president of National Federation of Indian Women, women's wing of Communist Party of India. She led the demand for the legislature of 1/3rd reservation for women in parliamentary elections in India.

== Early life and education ==
She was born on 8 January 1924 in Calcutta, West Bengal. She was married to Biswanath Mukherjee on 8 November 1942.

Mukherjee completed Bachelor of Arts In Bengali Literature from Ashutosh College, Calcutta. She remained secretary of Bengal Provincial Students Federation from 1947 to 1951.

== Career ==
She was first elected as Member, State Council, Communist Party of India (C.P.I.), Bengal in 1946. Popularly known as Geetadi, Geeta Mukherjee since then won every Lok Sabha election from Panskura in West Bengal, and was in the forefront till her death in 2000.

She was elected to 7th Lok Sabha in 1980 and during 1980–84, she served as

- Member, Committee on Public Undertakings
- Member, Committee on the Welfare of Scheduled Castes and Scheduled Tribes
- Member, Joint Committee on Criminal Law (Amendment) Bill, 1980

Since 1981 onwards, she was the Member of National Executive Council, Communist Party of India.

She was elected to her 7th term during the 13th Lok Sabha in 1999. Her career spanned about five and half decades. However, it was her role in the women's reservation issue which brought her into the limelight. She was also a member of the National Commission on Rural Labour, National Commission on Women, National Children's Board, Press Council and vice-president of the National Federation of Women, besides being a secretariat member of the Women's International Democratic Federation, Berlin. She led a Joint Parliamentary Committee which had drafted the Women's Reservation Bill.

Besides her political career, she also wrote a few books for children, including Bharat Upakatha (Folktales of India), Chotoder Rabindranath (Tagore for Children)and He Atit Katha Kao; and translated Bruno Apitz's 1958 classic Naked Among Wolves to Bengali.

== Death ==
Mukherjee died on 4 March 2000, following a massive heart-attack. Atal Bihari Vajpayee, the then Prime Minister of India, told in his condolence message— "Mrs. Mukherjee embodied determination and dedication. She was a shining example of women's empowerment. Her life shall remain an inspiration for future generations, especially women."
