= Seuli Saha =

Indian politician

Deputy Leader of the Opposition in West Bengal
- Incumbent
- Assumed office 3 June 2026 Serving with Sandipan Saha; Javed Ahmed Khan; Sabina Yeasmin
- Leader: Ritabrata Banerjee
- Preceded by: Ashima Patra; Nayna Bandyopadhyay

Member of West Bengal Legislative Assembly
- Incumbent
- Assumed office 4 May 2016
- Preceded by: Rameshwar Doloi
- Constituency: Keshpur

Personal details
- Born: January 19, 1970 (age 56)
- Party: Trinamool Congress (until 2026); Democratic Trinamool Congress (from 2026)
- Profession: Politician

Seuli Saha (born 19 January; 1970) is an Indian politician member of Democratic Trinamool Congress. She is an MLA, elected from the Keshpur constituency in the 2016 West Bengal state assembly election. In 2021 assembly election she was re-elected from the same constituency.
