= Manas Bhunia =

Indian politician

Manas Ranjan Bhunia
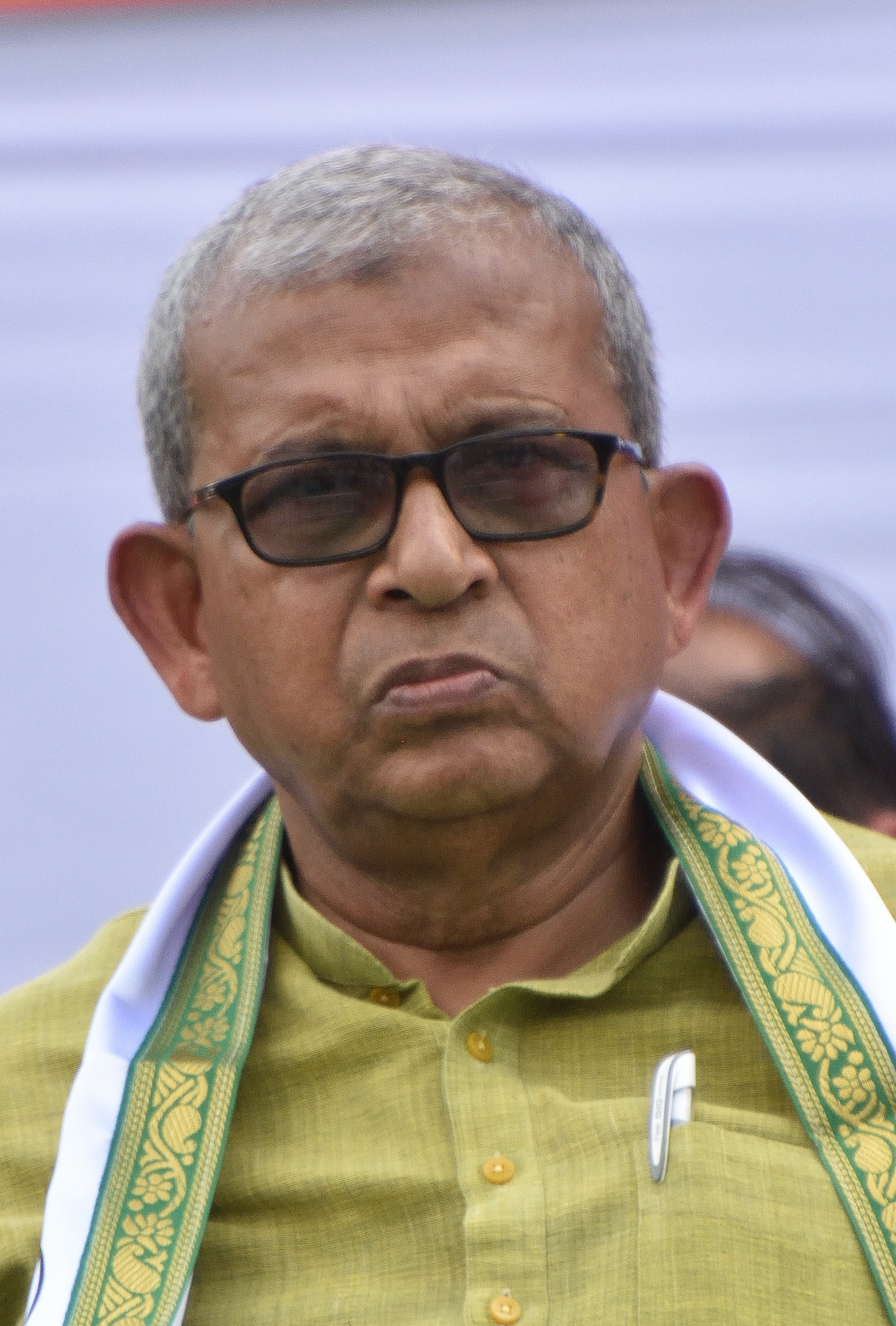
- Manas Ranjan Bhunia. March 2023.

Minister of Water Resources Investigation and Development Government of West Bengal
- In office 10 May 2021 – 7 May 2026
- Governor: Jagdeep Dhankhar; La. Ganesan (additional charge); C. V. Ananda Bose; R. N. Ravi
- Preceded by: Dr. Soumen Kumar Mahapatra
- Succeeded by: Arup Kumar Das

Member of Parliament, Rajya Sabha
- In office 19 August 2017 – 9 May 2021
- Preceded by: Debabrata Bandyopadhyay
- Succeeded by: Sushmita Dev

Minister for Irrigation and Waterways & Small and Micro Industries and Textile Government of West Bengal
- In office 20 May 2011 – 25 September 2012
- Governor: M. K. Narayanan
- Preceded by: Subhas Naskar (Irrigation and Waterways)
- Succeeded by: Mamata Banerjee

Member of the West Bengal Legislative Assembly
- In office 2 May 2021 – 4 May 2026
- Preceded by: Geeta Bhunia
- Succeeded by: Amal Kumar Panda
- Constituency: Sabang
- In office 11 May 2006 – 18 August 2017
- Preceded by: Tushar Kanti Laya
- Succeeded by: Geeta Bhunia
- In office 22 May 1982 – 14 May 1996
- Preceded by: Gouranga Samanta
- Succeeded by: Dr Makhan Lal Bangal

President of the West Bengal Pradesh Congress Committee
- In office 23 October 2008 – 17 January 2011
- Preceded by: Priya Ranjan Dasmunsi
- Succeeded by: Pradip Bhattacharya

Personal details
- Born: Manas Ranjan Bhunia; 28 February 1952 (age 74) Sabang, West Bengal, India
- Party: Trinamool Congress (2016–2026)
- Other political affiliations: Indian National Congress (1970–2016)
- Spouse: Gita Rani Bhunia

Manas Ranjan Bhunia (born 28 February 1952) is an Indian politician and was the Minister for Irrigation and Waterways and the Minister for Small & Micro Industries and Textile in the Government of West Bengal.

== Career ==
He passed M.B.B.S from N.R.S Medical College & Hospital, Kolkata in 1974. He is the son of the late Pulin Behari Bhunia, a freedom fighter. Bhunia became an MLA, elected from the Sabang constituency in the 2011 West Bengal state assembly election. He along with all other ministers in the state cabinet resigned after Indian National Congress withdrew support for the state government. He joined the All India Trinamool Congress (AITC) in 2016. He was the Minister of Water Resources Investigation and Development of the Government of West Bengal.

On 26 August 2015, he accused the West Bengal Police of selectively arresting supporters of the Chhatra Parishad movement. On September 16, he began an indefinite fast to protest the murder of one of the movement's members. In March 2021, he again got the AITC ticket to contest the 2021 West Bengal Assembly Election 2021 from Sabang constituency and won, defeating Amulya Maity of the BJP by 9,864 votes. He was defeated by Bharatiya Janata Party candidate Amal Kumar Panda in 2026 West Bengal Legislative Assembly election.
