= Ghatal Lok Sabha constituency =

Lok Sabha constituency in West Bengal

Coordinates: 22.7°N 87.7°E

Ghatal WB-32
- Lok Sabha constituency
- Interactive Map Outlining Ghatal Lok Sabha Constituency

Constituency details
- Country: India
- Region: East India
- State: West Bengal
- Assembly constituencies: Panskura Paschim; Sabang; Pingla; Debra; Daspur; Ghatal; Keshpur
- Established: 1951-1977; 2009-current
- Total electors: 19,39,945
- Reservation: None

Member of Parliament
- 18th Lok Sabha
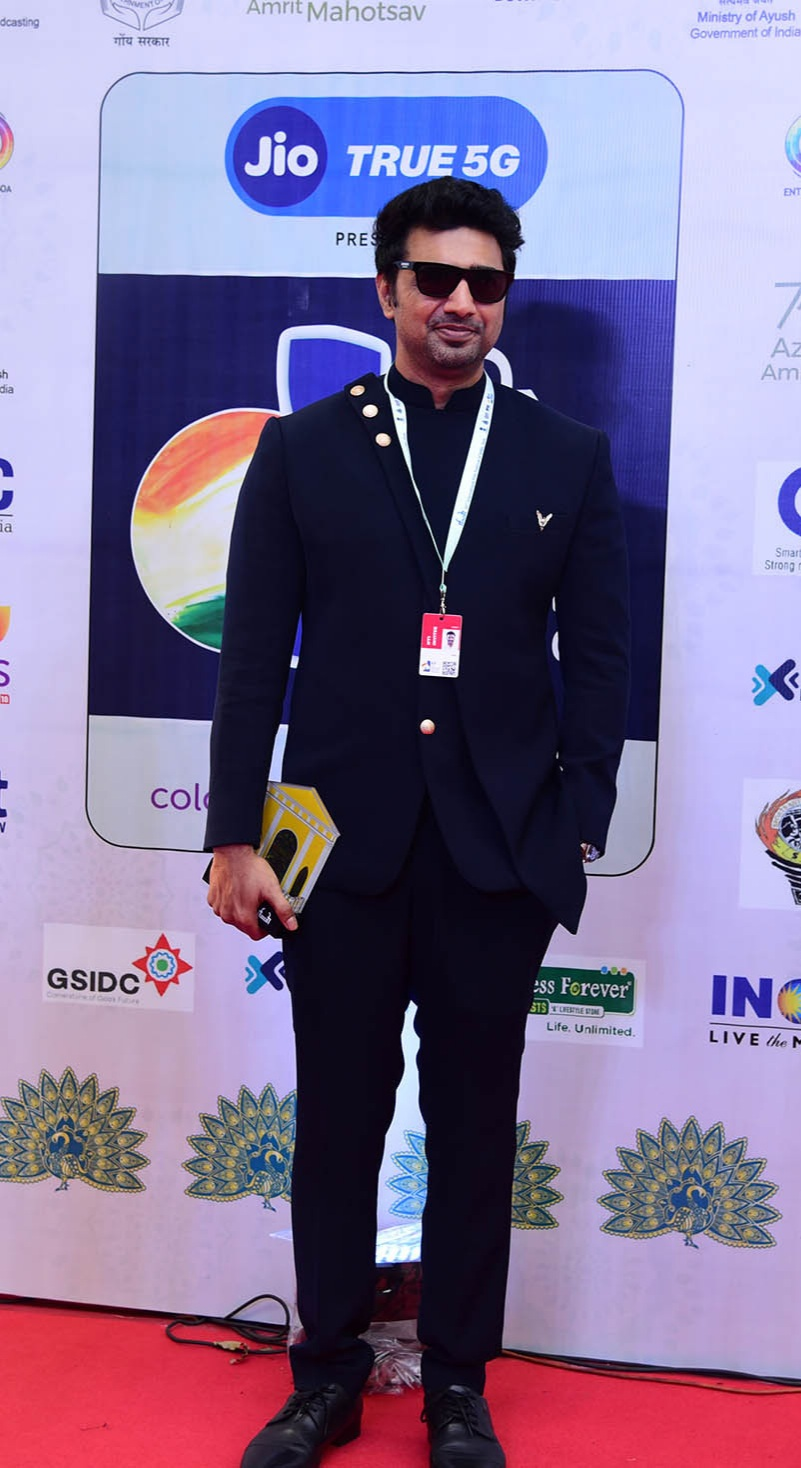
- Incumbent Deepak Adhikari
- Party: NCPI
- Alliance: NDA
- Elected year: 2024

Ghatal Lok Sabha constituency is one of the 543 constituencies of the lower house of parliament in India. The constituency is based on Ghatal in West Bengal. While six assembly segments of No. 32 Ghatal Lok Sabha constituency are in Paschim Medinipur district, one segment is in Purba Medinipur district. As per the order of the Delimitation Commission in respect of the delimitation of constituencies in the West Bengal, Panskura Lok Sabha constituency ceased to exist; and a new Ghatal Lok Sabha constituency came into being. The Ghatal constituency existed earlier from 1951 to 1977.

== Assembly segments ==
Parliamentary constituencies in West Bengal - 1. Cooch Behar, 2. Alipurduars, 3. Jalpaiguri, 4. Darjeeling, 5. Raiganj, 6. Balurghat, 7. Maldaha Uttar, 8. Maldaha Dakshin, 9. Jangipur, 10. Baharampur, 11. Murshidabad, 12. Krishnanagar, 13. Ranaghat, 14. Bangaon, 15. Barrackpore, 16. Dum Dum, 17. Barasat, 18. Basirhat, 19. Jaynagar, 20. Mathurapur, 21. Diamond Harbour, 22. Jadavpur, 23. Kolkata Dakshin, 24. Kolkata Uttar, 25. Howrah, 26. Uluberia, 27. Serampore, 28. Hooghly, 29. Arambagh, 30. Tamluk, 31, Kanthi, 32. Ghatal, 33. Jhargram, 34. Medinipur, 35. Purulia, 36. Bankura, 37. Bishnupur, 38. Bardhaman Purba, 39. Bardhaman Durgapur, 40. Asansol, 41. Bolpur, 42. Birbhum

Ghatal Lok Sabha constituency (parliamentary constituency no. 32) is composed of the following assembly segments:

#	Name	District	Member	Party	2024 Lead
205	Panskura Paschim	Purba Medinipur	Sintu Senapati	BJP	BJP
226	Sabang	Paschim Medinipur	Amal Kumar Panda	BJP	AITC
227	Pingla	Paschim Medinipur	Swagata Manna	BJP	AITC
229	Debra	Paschim Medinipur	Subhasish Om	BJP	AITC
230	Daspur	Paschim Medinipur	Tapan Dutta	BJP	AITC
231	Ghatal (SC)	Paschim Medinipur	Shital Kapat	BJP	AITC
235	Keshpur (SC)	Paschim Medinipur	Seuli Saha	AITC	AITC

== Members of Parliament ==
Year	Member	Party
1952	Nikunja Behari Chowdhury	Communist Party of India
1957	Nikunja Behari Maity	Indian National Congress
1962	Sachindra Chaudhuri	Indian National Congress
1967	Parimal Ghosh	Indian National Congress
1971	Jagadish Bhattachaya	Communist Party of India (Marxist)
1977-2009 : Constituency did not exist (Note: For Members of Parliament from the area during the period 1977-2009 see Panskura Lok Sabha constituency)
2009	Gurudas Dasgupta	Communist Party of India
2014	Deepak Adhikari	Trinamool Congress
2019	Deepak Adhikari	Trinamool Congress
2024	Deepak Adhikari	Trinamool Congress
2026 (Note: Switched to NCPI as part of AITC Rebels in Lok Sabha.)	Deepak Adhikari	Nationalist Citizens Party of India

- For Members of Parliament from the area during the period 1977-2009 see Panskura Lok Sabha constituency

== Election results ==
=== 18th Lok Sabha: 2024 General Elections ===
2024 Indian general elections:Ghatal
Party	Candidate	Votes	%	±%
AITC	Deepak Adhikari (Dev)	837,990	52.36	▲4.14
BJP	Hiranmoy Chatterjee (Hiran)	655,122	40.93	▼0.04
CPI	Tapan Ganguly	74,908	4.68	▼1.88
NOTA	None of the Above	12,966	0.81	▼0.12
BSP	Soumen Madraji	7,941	0.50	Steady
Independent	Gopal Mondal	4,244	0.27	N/A
SUCI(C)	Dinesh Maikap	4,158	0.26	▼0.14
Independent	Saheb Chowdhury	3,237	0.20	N/A
Majority		182,868	11.43	▲4.18
Turnout		1,600,556	82.51	▼0.23
AITC hold		Swing		

=== 17th Lok Sabha: 2019 General Elections ===
2019 Indian general elections: Ghatal
Party	Candidate	Votes	%	±%
AITC	Deepak Adhikari (Dev)	717,959	48.22	−2.48
BJP	Bharati Ghosh	609,986	40.97	+34.04
CPI	Tapan Ganguly	97,062	6.56	−24.88
INC	Khandakar Mohammad Saifullah	32,793	2.21	−6.78
NOTA	None of the Above	13,796	0.93	N/A
Majority		107,973	7.25	−11.85
Turnout		1,489,338	82.74	
AITC hold		Swing	-15.78	

=== 16th Lok Sabha : General election 2014 ===
2014 Indian general election: Ghatal
Party	Candidate	Votes	%	±%
AITC	Dipak Adhikari (Dev)	685,696	50.70	+9.78
CPI	Santosh Rana	424,805	31.40	−22.16
INC	Manas Bhunia	122,928	8.99	
BJP	Md. Alam	94,842	6.93	+3.94
SUCI(C)	Anjan Jana	8,080		
AMB	Goutam Kouri	5,547		
Independent	Gopal Mondal	4,498		
Jharkhand Anushilan Party	Gopal Murmu	2,154		
RJSP	Gobardhan Ghosh	1,983		
PDS	Gangaram Sasmal	1,758		
Majority		260,891	19.10	
Turnout		1,366,909	84.88	
AITC gain from CPI		Swing		

=== General election 2009 ===
General Election, 2009: Ghatal
Party	Candidate	Votes	%	±%
CPI	Gurudas Dasgupta	625,923	53.56	−8.36
AITC	Noor Alam Chowdhury	478,739	40.92	+10.82
BJP	Matilal Khatua	34,997	2.99	
BSP	Narayan Chandra Samat	12,064	1.03	
IJP	Liyakat Khan	9,355	0.80	
JMM	Arun Kumar Das	5,333	0.46	
RDMP	Ahitosh Maity	3,515	0.30	
Majority		147,184	12.64	
Turnout		11,69,934	86.35	
CPI hold		Swing		

For Members of Parliament from the area during the period 1977-2009 see Panskura Lok Sabha constituency

=== General election 1971 ===
General Election, 1971: Ghatal
Party	Candidate	Votes	%	±%
CPI(M)	Jagadish Bhattacharyya	128,366	35.71	
INC	Parimal Ghosh	127,044	35.34	
CPI	Prabhat Kar	62,824	17.48	
BBC	Surendra Nath Ghorai	20,513	5.71	
NCO	Ramdas Ramanuj Das Mahanta	16,403	4.56	
Independent	Gobardhan Dey	4,306	1.20	
Majority		1,322	0.4	
Turnout		3,59,456	73.12%	
CPI gain from INC		Swing		

=== General election 1967 ===
General Election, 1967: Ghatal
Party	Candidate	Votes	%	±%
INC	Parimal Ghosh	138,572	41.59%	
CPI	Prabhat Kar	109,662	32.91%	
CPI(M)	Nikunja Chowdhury	84,945	25.50%	
Majority		28,910		
Turnout		3,33,179	73.27%	
INC hold		Swing		

=== General election 1962 ===
General Election, 1962: Ghatal
Party	Candidate	Votes	%	±%
INC	Sachindra Nath Chowdhury	179,045	52.50%	
CPI	Manoranjan Roy	148,207	43.40%	
ABHM	Basanta kumar Chakraborty	7,049	2.10	
Majority		30,838	(9.0%)	
Turnout		3,34,301	(63.8%)	
INC hold		Swing		

=== General election 1957 ===
General Election, 1957: Ghatal
Party	Candidate	Votes	%	±%
INC	Nikunja Behari Maity	165,597	59.65%	
CPI	Manoranjan Roy	112,025	40.35%	
Majority		53,572	(9.0%)	
Turnout		277,622	(62.6%)	
INC gain from CPI		Swing		

=== General election 1952 ===
General Election, 1952: Ghatal
Party	Candidate	Votes	%	±%
CPI	Nikunja Behari Chowdhury	73,435	40.70%	
INC	Maitayee Basu	68,916	38.20%	
Independent	Satcori Pati Roy	38,028	21.10	
Majority		4,519		
Turnout		1,80,379	(49.9%)	
CPI win (new seat)				

=== General elections 1951-1971 ===
Most of the contests were multi-cornered. However, only winners and runners-up are mentioned below:

Year	Winner	Party	Runner-up	Party
1951	Nikunja Behari Chowdhury	CPI	Maitreyee Basu	Indian National Congress
1957	Nikunja Behari Maity	Indian National Congress	Nikunja Behari Chwdhury	Communist Party of India
1962	Sachindra Chaudhuri	Indian National Congress	Manoranjan Roy	Communist Party of India
1967	Parimal Ghosh	Indian National Congress	Prabhat Kar	Communist Party of India
1971	Jagadish Bhattacharyya	Communist Party of India (Marxist)	Parimal Ghosh	Indian National Congress

== See also ==
- List of constituencies of the Lok Sabha
