= Sabang (community development block) =

- Community development block
- Coordinates: 22.176°N 87.601°E
- Country: India
- State: West Bengal
- District: Paschim Medinipur

Government
  - Type: Federal democracy

Area
  - Total: 305.00 km^{2} (117.76 sq mi)
- Elevation: 17 m (56 ft)

Population (2011)
  - Total: 270,492
  - Density: 886.86/km^{2} (2,297.0/sq mi)

Languages
  - Official: Bengali, Santali, English
- Time zone: UTC+5:30 (IST)
- PIN: 721144 (Sabang); 721161 (Mohar); 721467 (Dasagram)
- Telephone/STD code: 03228
- ISO 3166 code: IN-WB
- Vehicle registration: WB-34
- Literacy: 86.84%
- Lok Sabha constituency: Ghatal
- Vidhan Sabha constituency: Sabang
- Website: sabangblock.in

Sabang is a community development block that forms an administrative division in the Kharagpur subdivision of Paschim Medinipur district in the Indian state of West Bengal.

== Geography ==
Sabang is a monotonous rice plain with numerous waterways and tidal creeks intersecting it. The tidal creeks are lined with embankments to prevent flooding of the fields. Much of the area is water-logged in the rainy season resulting in loss of crops. In Sabang CD block 100% of the cultivated area has highly productive alluvial soil.

Sabang is located at 22°10′34″N 87°36′04″E.

Sabang CD block is bounded by Pingla CD block in the north, Moyna CD block, in Purba Medinipur district, in the east, Patashpur I CD block, in Purba Medinipur district, in the south and Narayangarh CD block in the west.

It is located 45 km from Midnapore, the district headquarters.

Sabang CD block has an area of 305.00 km^{2}. It has 1 panchayat samity, 13 gram panchayats, 200 gram sansads (village councils), 232 mouzas and 226 inhabited villages. Sabang police station serves this block. Headquarters of this CD block is at Sabang.

Gram panchayats of Sabang block/ panchayat samiti are: Balpai, Bhemua, Bishnupur, Bural, Chaulkuri, Danrra, Dasagram, Debhog, Mohar, Narayanbarh, Nawgaon, Sabang and Sartta.

== Demographics ==
=== Population ===
According to the 2011 Census of India, Sabang CD block had a total population of 270,492, all of which were rural. There were 138,924 (51%) males and 131,568 (49%) females. Population in the age range 0–6 years was 31,689. Scheduled Castes numbered 36,064 (13.33%) and Scheduled Tribes numbered 16,818 (6.22%).

According to the 2001 census, Sabang block had a population of 238,686, out of which 122,778 were males and 115,908 females. Sabang block registered a population growth of 14.84 per cent during the 1991-2001 decade. Decadal growth for the combined Midnapore district was 14.87 per cent. Decadal growth in West Bengal was 17.45 per cent.

Large villages (with 4,000+ population) in Sabang CD block are (2011 census figures in brackets): Sabang (13,224), Dubrajpur (4,578), Dasha Gram (5,232), Adasimla (4,622), Bural (5,145), Mohar (6,995), Nimkimohar (5,055) and Bishnupur (8,678).

Other villages in Sabang CD block included (2011 census figures in brackets): Narayanbar (2,450), Sartla (1,856), Danrra (2,924), Debhog (2,508), Balpai (2,867), Bhemwa (3,967), Chaaulkuri (3,519), Shrirampur (933), Kerur (1,642), Tilantapara (1,593) and Kolanda (1520).

=== Literacy ===
According to the 2011 census, the total number of literate persons in Sabang CD block was 207,370 (86.84% of the population over 6 years) out of which males numbered 114,304 (93.16% of the male population over 6 years) and females numbered 93,066 (80.15% of the female population over 6 years). The gender gap in literacy rates was 13.01%.

See also – List of West Bengal districts ranked by literacy rate

Literacy in CD blocks of
Paschim Medinipur district
Jhargram subdivision
Binpur I – 69.74%
Binpur II – 70.46%
Gopiballavpur I – 65.44%
Gopiballavpur II – 71.40%
Jamboni – 72.63%
Jhargram – 72.23%
Nayagram – 63.70%
Sankrail – 73.35%
Medinipur Sadar subdivision
Garhbeta I – 72.21%
Garhbeta II – 75.87%
Garhbeta III – 73.42%
Keshpur – 77.88%
Midnapore Sadar – 70.48%
Salboni – 74.87%
Ghatal subdivision
Chandrakona I – 78.93%
Chandrakona II – 75.96%
Daspur I – 83.99%
Daspur II – 85.62%
Ghatal – 81.08%
Kharagpur subdivision
Dantan I – 73.53%
Dantan II – 82.45%
Debra – 82.03%
Keshiari – 76.78%
Kharagpur I – 77.06%
Kharagpur II – 76.08%
Mohanpur – 80.51%
Narayangarh – 78.31%
Pingla – 83.57%
Sabang – 86.84%
2011 Census: CD Block Wise

Primary Census Abstract Data

=== Language and religion ===
Religion in Sabang CD block (2011)
Hinduism	93.71%
Islam	6.12%
Other or not stated	0.17%

In the 2011 census Hindus numbered 253,471 and formed 93.71% of the population in Sabang CD block. Muslims numbered 16,546 and formed 6.12% of the population. Others numbered 475 and formed 0.17% of the population. Others include Addi Bassi, Marang Boro, Santal, Saranath, Sari Dharma, Sarna, Alchchi, Bidin, Sant, Saevdharm, Seran, Saran, Sarin, Kheria, Christian and other religious communities. In 2001, Hindus were 94.46% and Muslims 5.31% of the population respectively.

Languages of Sabang CD block (2011)
1. Bengali (95.3%)
2. Santali (2.77%)
3. Urdu (1.04%)
4. Others (0.93%)

At the time of the 2011 census, 95.26% of the population spoke Bengali, 2.77% Santali and 1.04% Urdu as their first language.

== BPL families ==
In Sabang CD block 37.37% families were living below poverty line in 2007.

According to the District Human Development Report of Paschim Medinipur: The 29 CD blocks of the district were classified into four categories based on the poverty ratio. Nayagram, Binpur II and Jamboni CD blocks have very high poverty levels (above 60%). Kharagpur I, Kharagpur II, Sankrail, Garhbeta II, Pingla and Mohanpur CD blocks have high levels of poverty (50-60%), Jhargram, Midnapore Sadar, Dantan I, Gopiballavpur II, Binpur I, Dantan II, Keshiari, Chandrakona I, Gopiballavpur I, Chandrakona II, Narayangarh, Keshpur, Ghatal, Sabang, Garhbeta I, Salboni, Debra and Garhbeta III CD blocks have moderate levels of poverty (25-50%) and Daspur II and Daspur I CD blocks have low levels of poverty (below 25%).

== Economy ==
=== Infrastructure ===
225 or 97% of mouzas in Sabang CD block were electrified by 31 March 2014.

225 mouzas in Sabang CD block had drinking water facilities in 2013–14. There were 148 fertiliser depots, 105 seed stores and 54 fair price shops in the CD Block.

=== Agriculture ===
Persons engaged in agriculture
in Sabang CD block
1. Bargadars (4.68%)
2. Patta holders (19.4%)
3. Small farmers (4.01%)
4. Marginal farmers (25.7%)
5. Agricultural labourers (46.3%)

Although the Bargadari Act of 1950 recognised the rights of bargadars to a higher share of crops from the land that they tilled, it was not implemented fully. Large tracts, beyond the prescribed limit of land ceiling, remained with the rich landlords. From 1977 onwards major land reforms took place in West Bengal. Land in excess of land ceiling was acquired and distributed amongst the peasants. Following land reforms land ownership pattern has undergone transformation. In 2013–14, persons engaged in agriculture in Sabang CD block could be classified as follows: bargadars 4.68%, patta (document) holders 19.36%, small farmers (possessing land between 1 and 2 hectares) 4.01%, marginal farmers (possessing land up to 1 hectare) 25.67% and agricultural labourers 46.28%.

In 2005-06 the nett cropped area in Sabang CD block was 21,083 hectares out of the total geographical area of 30,075 hectares and the area in which more than one crop was grown was 20,526 hectares.

The extension of irrigation has played a role in growth of the predominant agricultural economy. In 2013–14, the total area irrigated in Sabang CD block was 17,000 hectares, out of which 3,000 hectares were irrigated by tank water, 1,120 hectares by deep tubewells, 10,060 hectares by shallow tubewells, 320 hectares by river lift irrigation and 2,500 hectares by other methods.

In 2013–14, Sabang CD block produced 30,519 tonnes of Aman paddy, the main winter crop, from 15,912 hectares, 16,306 tonnes of Aus paddy (summer crop) from 7,259 hectares, 86,159 tonnes of Boro paddy (spring crop) from 22,354 hectares, 8,084 tonnes of jute from 467 hectares and 105 tonnes of potatoes from 5 hectares. It also produced oilseeds. The production of both Boro paddy and Aus paddy were the highest amongst all the CD Blocks in the district.

=== Banking ===
In 2013–14, Sabang CD block had offices of 14 commercial banks and 1 gramin bank.

== Transport ==
Sabang CD block has 9 ferry services and 7 originating/ terminating bus routes.

== Education ==
In 2013–14, Sabang CD block had 230 primary schools with 18,365 students, 15 middle schools with 796 students, 31 high schools with 14,413 students and 17 higher secondary schools with 19,567 students. Sabang CD block had 1 general college with 1,475 students and 461 institutions for special and non-formal education with 15,888 students.

The United Nations Development Programme considers the combined primary and secondary enrolment ratio as the simple indicator of educational achievement of the children in the school going age. The infrastructure available is important. In Sabang CD block out of the total 230 primary schools in 2008–2009, 44 had pucca buildings, 119 partially pucca, 2 kucha and 65 multiple type.

Sabang Sajani Kanta Mahavidyalaya at Lutunia was established in 1970 and is affiliated to Vidyasagar University. It offers undergraduate courses in arts, commerce and science.

== Culture ==
The Sabang CD block has a number of heritage temples, in danger of being lost for ever.

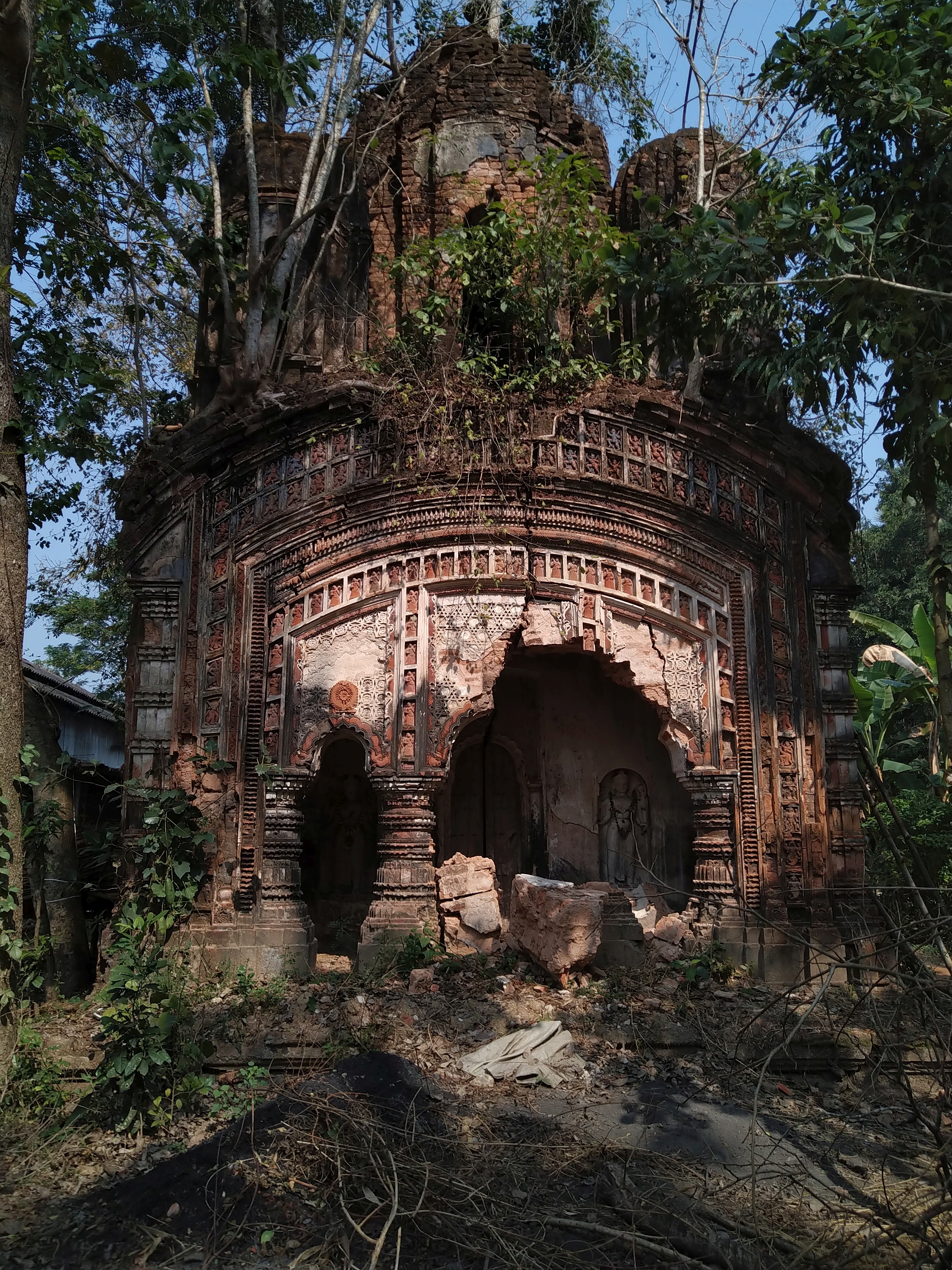
Shrirampur : The Lakshmi Janardana temple, with rich terracotta carvings, built in 1870, now in ruinous state

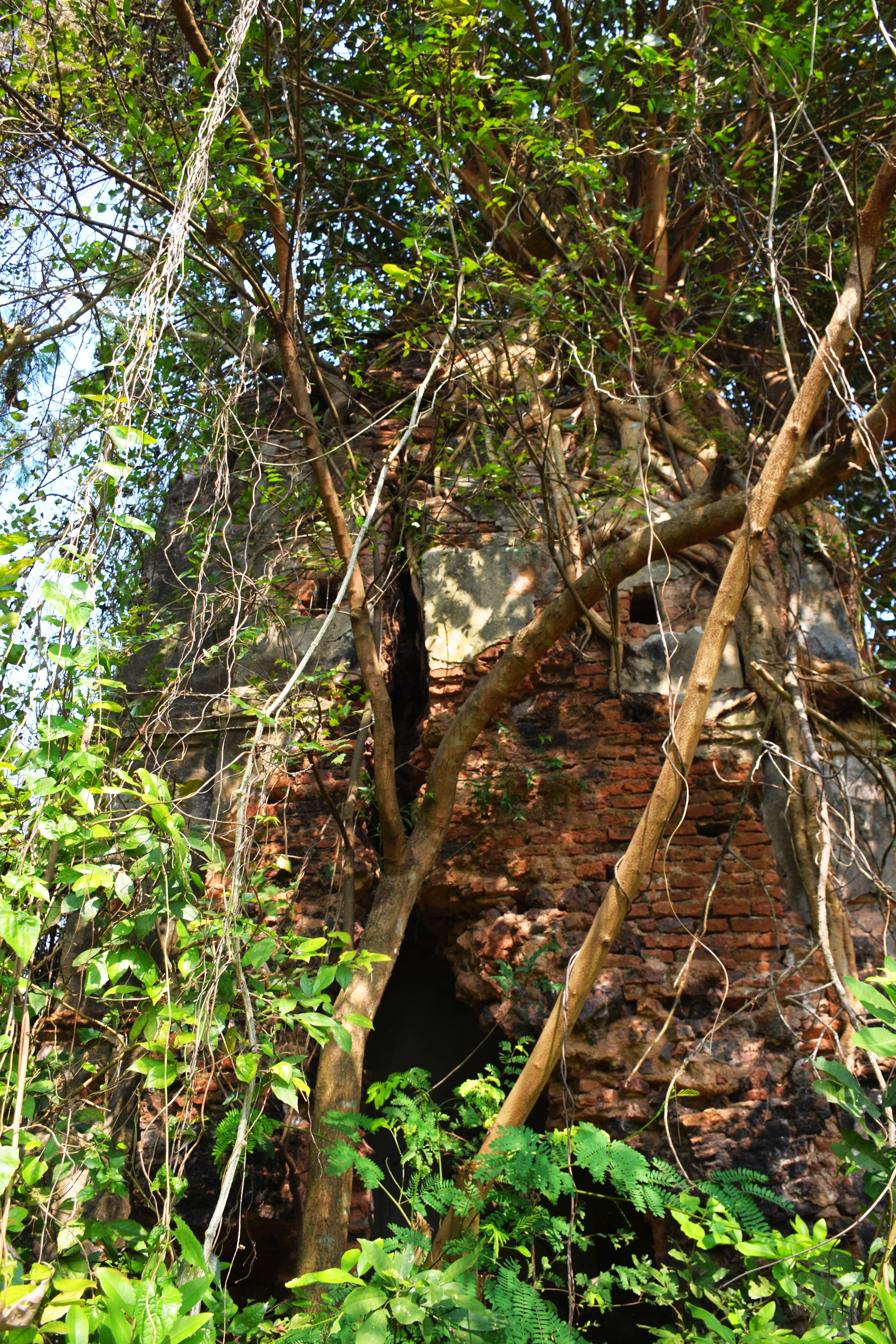
Kerur: The Baikuntha Nath deul may collapse any day

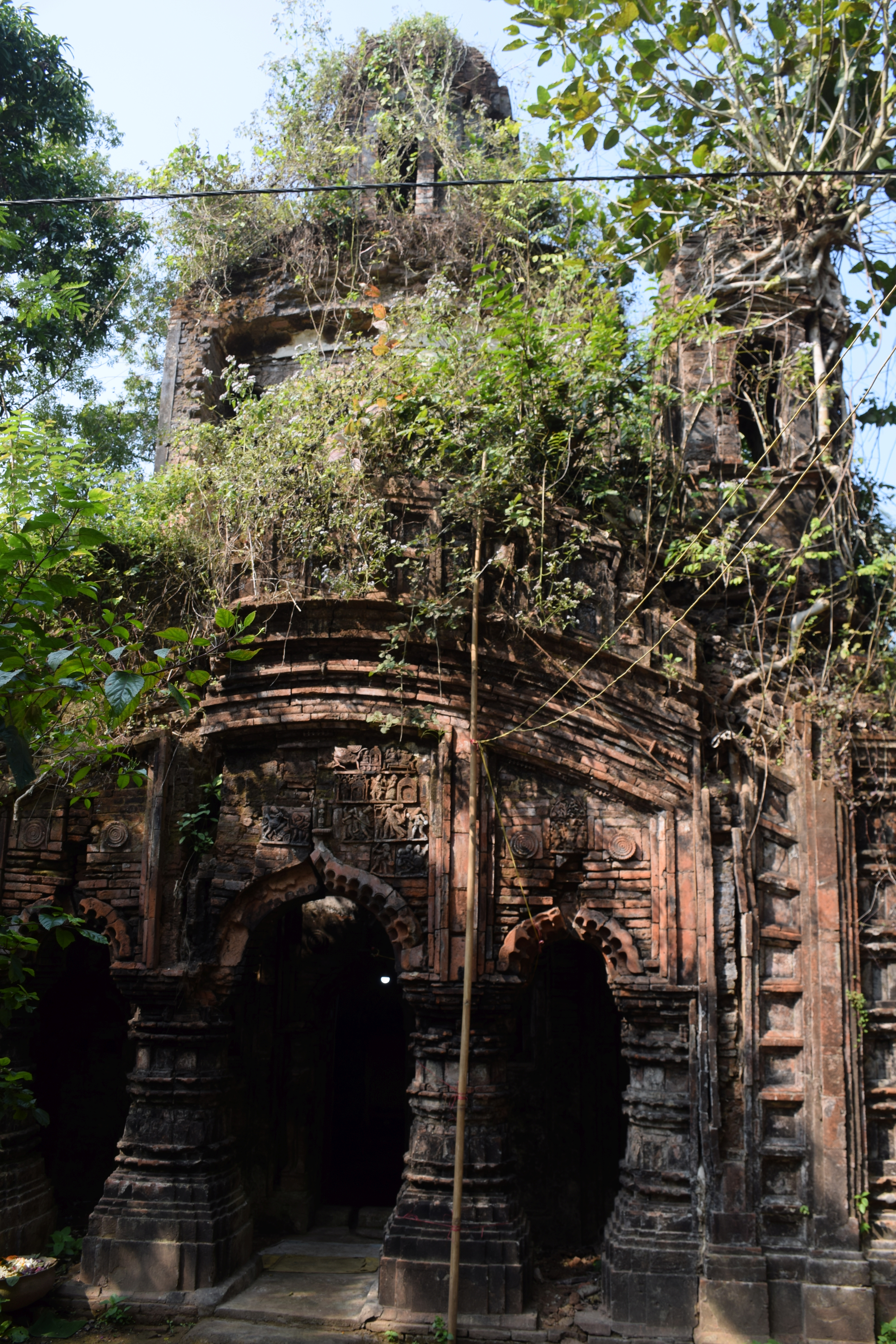
Bhemwa: The Sitaram temple, with rich terracotta relief

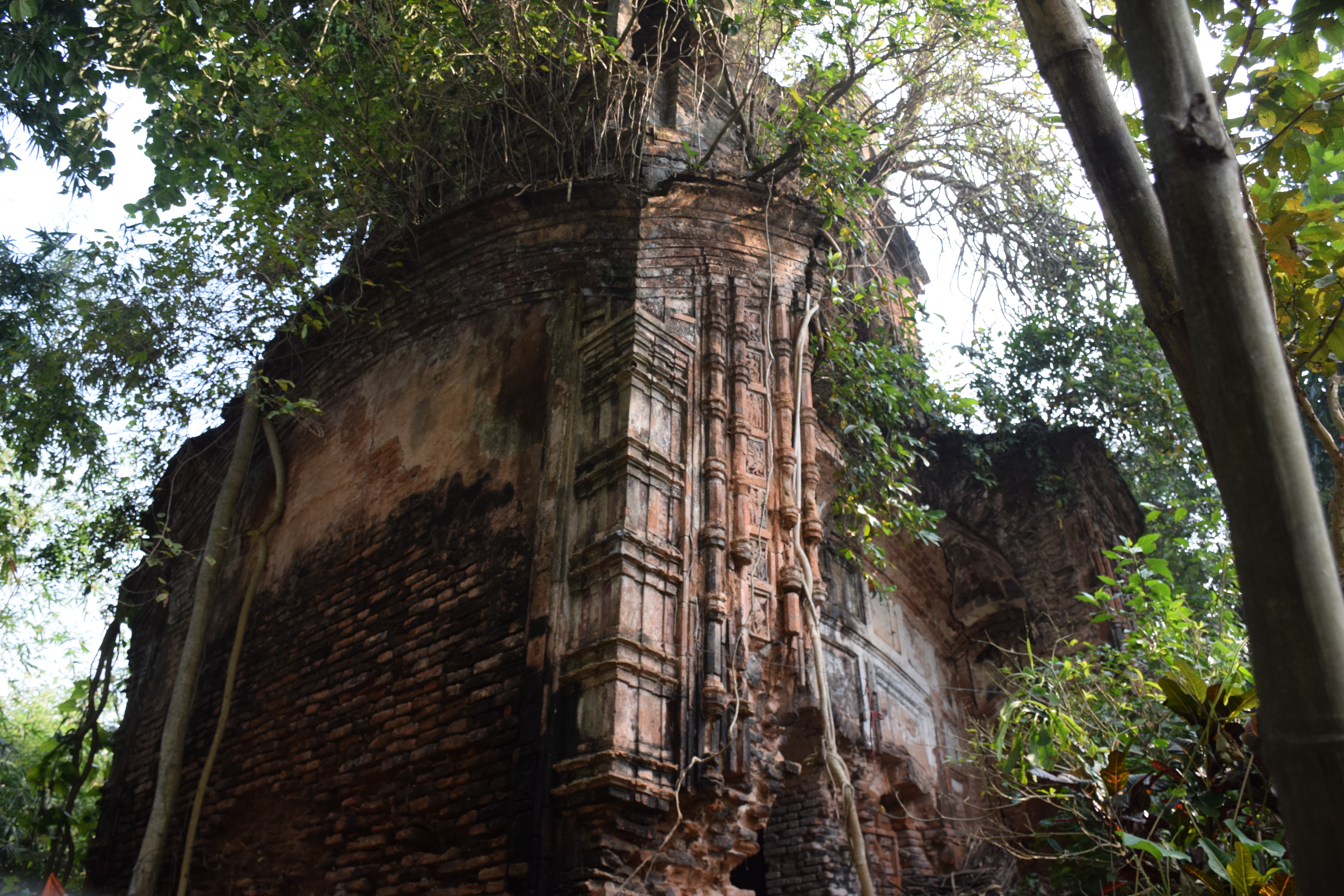
Dubrajpur: The Laxmi Janardan temple, built in 1811, with rich terracotta decoration, now in a ruinous condition

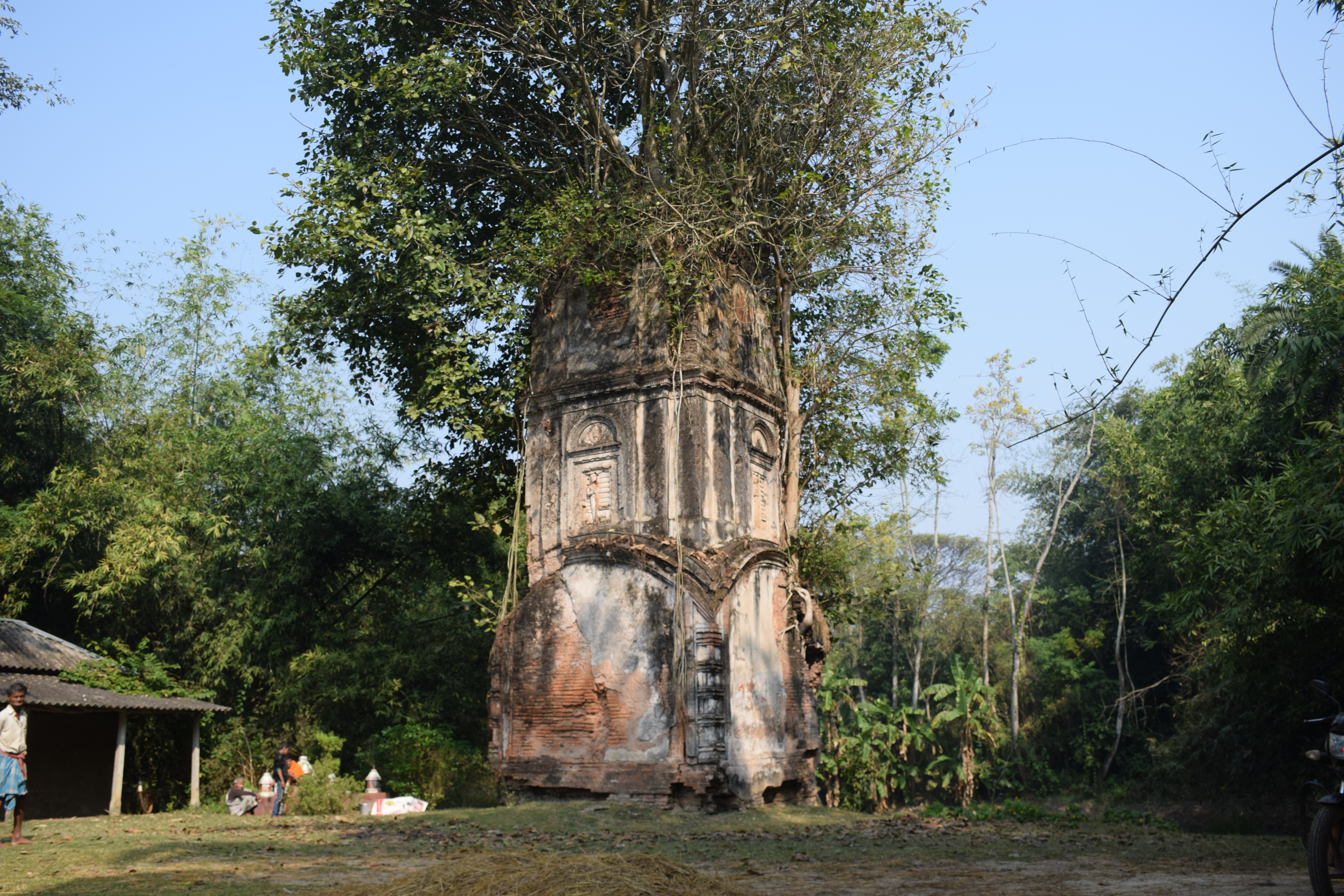
Adasimla: The Rudreshwara temple

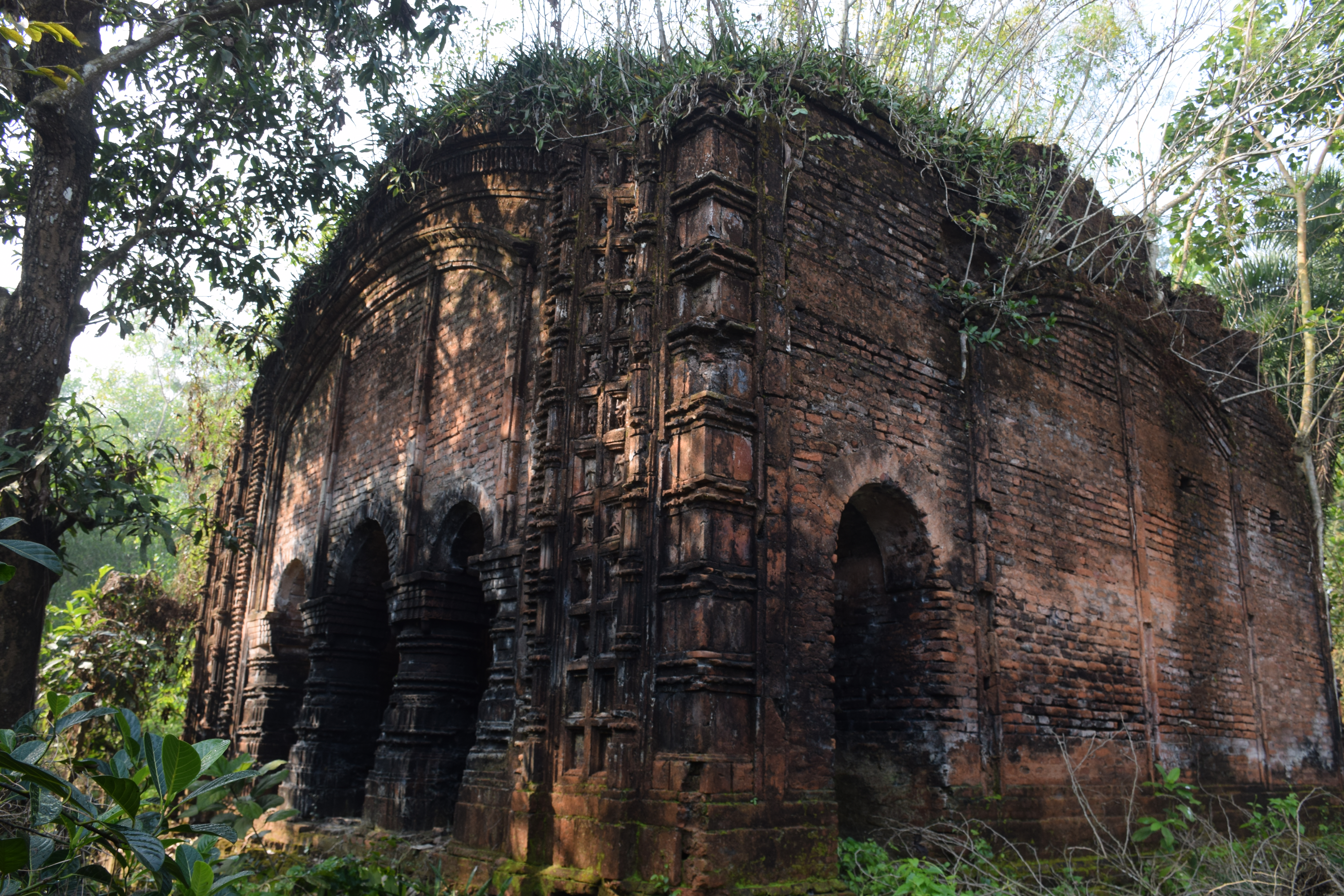
Kolanda: The Shyama Sundar temple, all five pinnacles (ratnas) have fallen

== Healthcare ==
In 2014, Sabang CD block had 1 rural hospital, 3 primary health centres and 1 private nursing home with total 78 beds and 10 doctors. It had 36 family welfare sub centres and 1 family welfare centre. 7,298 patients were treated indoor and 182,238 patients were treated outdoor in the hospitals, health centres and subcentres of the CD block.

Sabang Rural Hospital, with 40 beds at Sabang, is the major government medical facility in the Sabang CD block. There are primary health centres at: Mohor (with 10 beds), Kharika (with 10 beds) and Uchitpur (with 4 beds).
