= Godapiasal railway station =

Railway Station in West Bengal

Godapiasal

General information
- Location: National Highway 60, Godapiasal, Paschim Medinipur district, West Bengal; India
- Coordinates: 22°31′50″N 87°19′15″E
- Elevation: 46 metres (151 ft)
- System: Indian Railway
- Owner: Indian railway
- Operator: South Eastern Railways
- Line: Kharagpur–Bankura–Adra line
- Platforms: 3
- Tracks: 2

Construction
- Structure type: At Ground
- Parking: Yes

Other information
- Status: Functioning
- Station code: GSL
- Zone(s): South Eastern Railway
- Division(s): Adra railway division

History
- Opened: April 1903
- Former names: Bengal Nagpur Railway

Services
Preceding station	Indian Railways	Following station
Salboni towards Adra Junction	South Eastern Railway zone Kharagpur–Bankura–Adra line	Jangalmahal Bhadutala towards Kharagpur Junction
Location
- Location within West Bengal Location within India

Godapiasal railway station is a railway station on Kharagpur–Bankura–Adra line in Adra railway division of South Eastern Railway zone. It is situated beside National Highway 60 at Godapiasal of Paschim Medinipur district in the Indian state of West Bengal.

== History ==
In 1901, the Kharagpur–Midnapur Branch line was opened. The Midnapore–Jharia extension of the Bengal Nagpur Railway, passing through Bankura District was opened in 1903–04. The Adra–Bheduasol sector was electrified in 1997–98 and the Bheduasol–Salboni sector in 1998–99.
