= Bhemwa =

- Village
- Location in West Bengal, India Bhemwa (India)
- Coordinates: 22.2232°N 87.6828°E
- Country: India
- State: West Bengal
- District: Paschim Medinipur

Population (2011)
  - Total: 3,967

Languages
  - Official: Bengali, Santali, English
- Time zone: UTC+5:30 (IST)
- PIN: 721155
- Telephone/STD code: 03228
- Lok Sabha constituency: Ghatal
- Vidhan Sabha constituency: Sabang
- Website: paschimmedinipur.gov.in

Bhemwa (also written as Bhemua) is a village and a gram panchayat in the Sabang CD block in the Kharagpur subdivision of the Paschim Medinipur district in the state of West Bengal, India.

== Geography ==
Cities and towns in the southern portion of Kharagpur subdivision (including Dantan I & II, Mohanpur, Keshiary, Narayangarh and Sabang CD blocks) of Paschim Medinipur district
CT: census town, R: rural/ urban centre, H: historical/ religious centre
Owing to space constraints in the small map, the actual locations in a larger map may vary slightly

=== Location ===
Bhemwa is located at 22.2232°N 87.6828°E.

=== Area overview ===
Kharagpur subdivision, shown partly in the map alongside, mostly has alluvial soils, except in two CD blocks in the west – Kharagpur I and Keshiary, which mostly have lateritic soils. Around 74% of the total cultivated area is cropped more than once. With a density of population of 787 per km^{2}nearly half of the district's population resides in this subdivision. 14.33% of the population lives in urban areas and 86.67% lives in the rural areas.

Note: The map alongside presents some of the notable locations in the subdivision. All places marked in the map are linked in the larger full screen map.

== Demographics ==
According to the 2011 Census of India, Bhemwa had a total population of 3,967, of which 2,061 (52%) were males and 1,906 (48%) were females. There were 447 persons in the age range of 0–6 years. The total number of literate persons in Bhemwa was 3237 (91.96% of the population over 6 years).

.*For language details see Sabang (community development block)#Language and religion

== Education ==
Bhemwa A.B. High School is a Bengali-medium co-educational institution established in 1957. It has facilities for teaching from class V to class XII. It has a library with 2,600 books, 9 computers and a playground.

Bhemwa R.T. Girls School is a Bengali-medium girls only institution established in 1966. It has facilities for teaching from class V to class X. It has a library with 325 books and a playground. Girls

== Bhemwa picture gallery ==
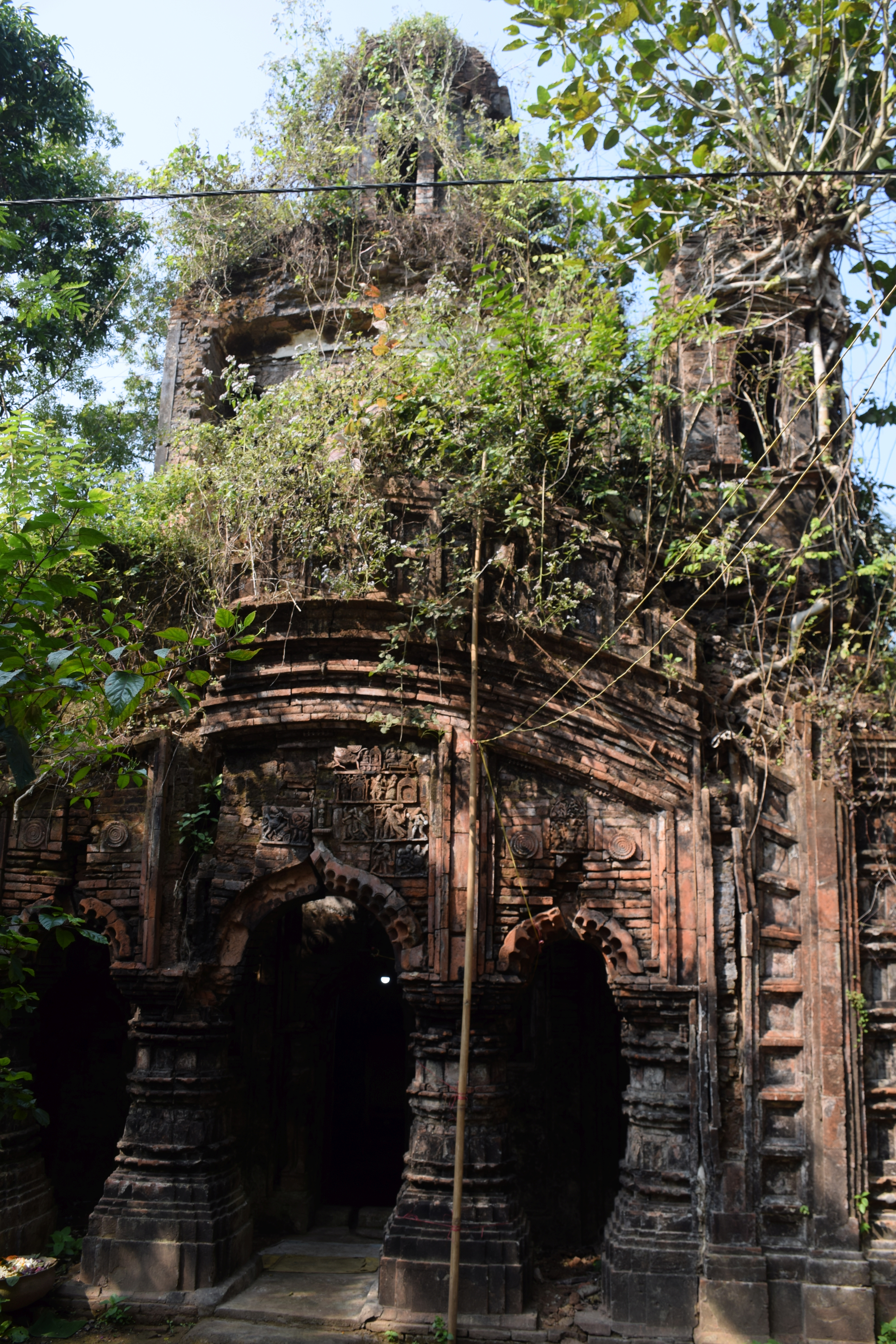
Naba-ratna Sitaram temple of Bhattacharya family

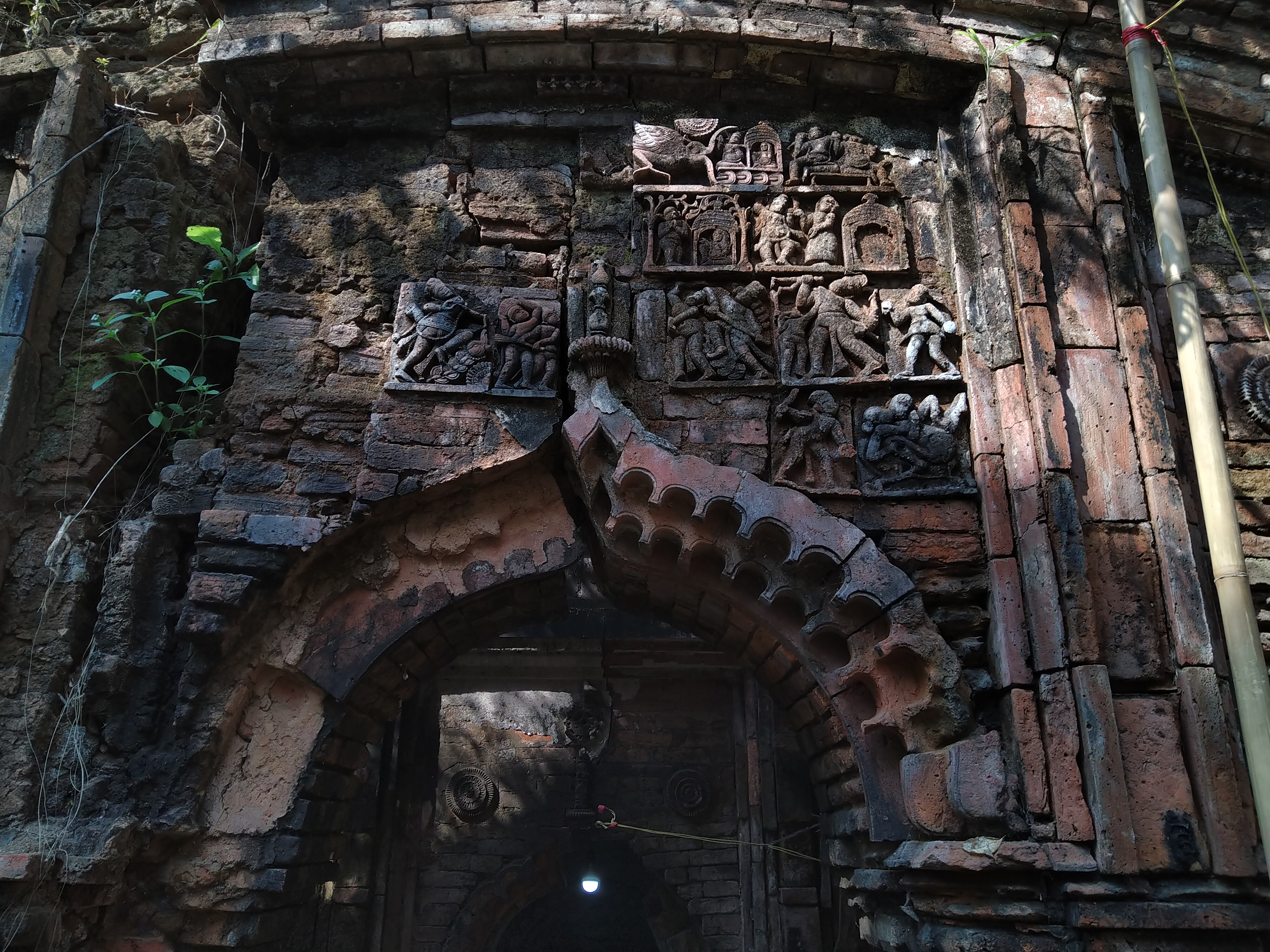
Terracotta relief in Sitaram temple
