= Jangalmahal Bhadutala railway station =

Railway Station in West Bengal

Jangalmahal Bhadutala

General information
- Location: Lalgarh-Midnapore Road, Bhadutala, Paschim Medinipur district, West Bengal; India
- Coordinates: 22°29′08″N 87°19′15″E
- Elevation: 48 metres (157 ft)
- System: Indian Railway
- Owner: Indian railway
- Operator: South Eastern Railways
- Line: Kharagpur–Bankura–Adra line
- Platforms: 2
- Tracks: 2

Construction
- Structure type: At Ground
- Parking: Yes

Other information
- Status: Functioning
- Station code: BUTA
- Zone(s): South Eastern Railway
- Division(s): Adra railway division

History
- Opened: 1903–04
- Former names: Bengal Nagpur Railway

Services
Preceding station	Indian Railways	Following station
Godapiasal towards Adra Junction	South Eastern Railway zone Kharagpur–Bankura–Adra line	Midnapore towards Kharagpur Junction
Location
- Location within West Bengal Location within India

Jangalmahal Bhadutala railway station is a railway station on Kharagpur–Bankura–Adra line in Adra railway division of South Eastern Railway zone. It is situated beside Lalgarh–Midnapore Road at Bhadutala of Paschim Medinipur district in the Indian state of West Bengal.

== History ==
In 1901, the Kharagpur–Midnapur Branch line was opened. The Midnapore–Jharia extension of the Bengal Nagpur Railway, passing through Bankura District was opened in 1903–04. The Adra–Bheduasol sector was electrified in 1997–98 and the Bheduasol–Salboni sector in 1998–99.
