= Salboni =

- Village
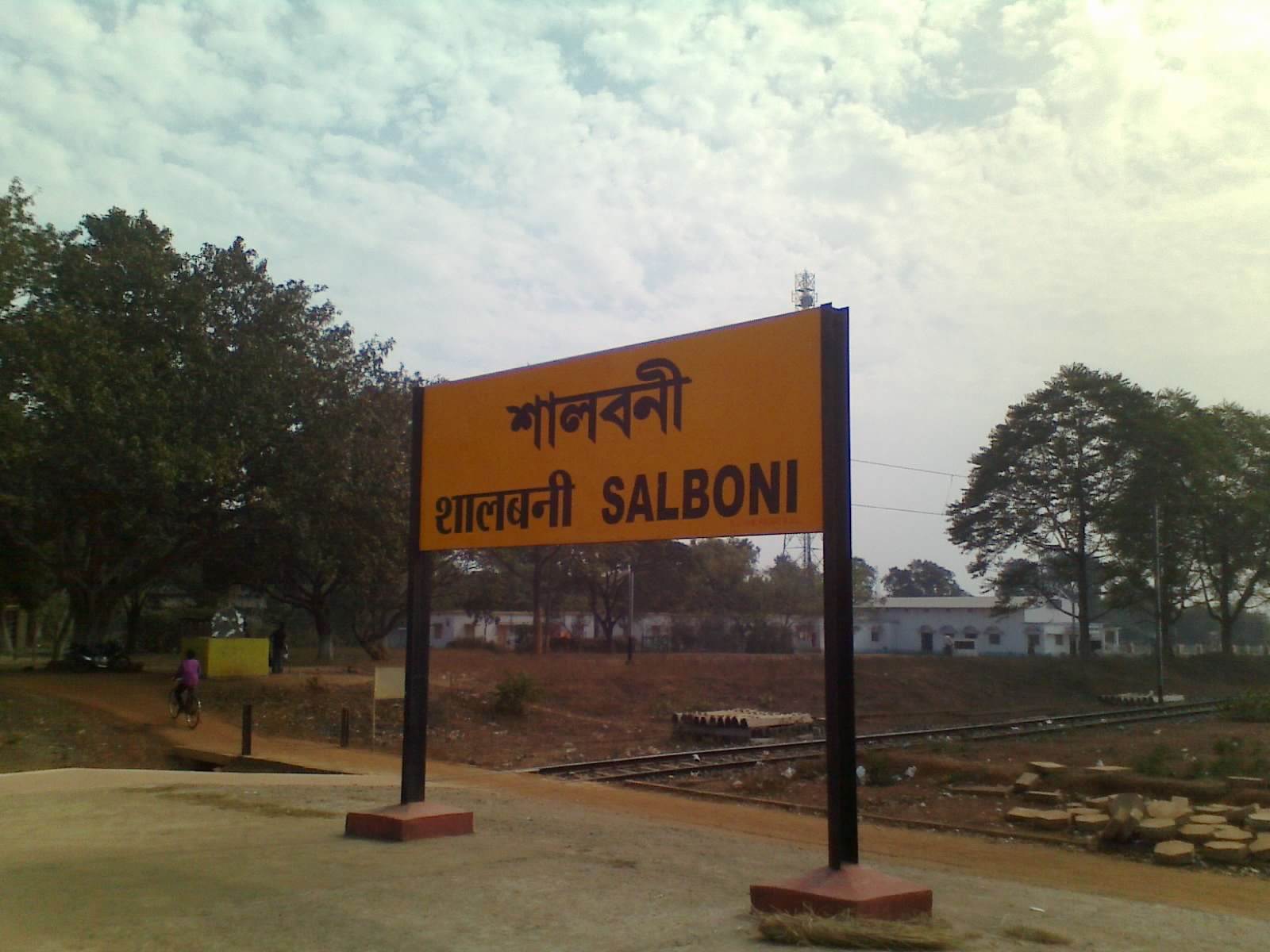
- Shalbani railway station

- Location in West Bengal, India
- Coordinates: 22.5654°N 87.1548°E
- Country: India22.5654,87.1548
- State: West Bengal
- District: Paschim Medinipur
- Elevation: 25 m (82 ft)

Population (2011)
  - Total: 3,963

Languages*
  - Official: Bengali, Santali, English
- Time zone: UTC+5:30 (IST)
- PIN: 721147
- Telephone code: 03227
- ISO 3166 code: IN-WB
- Vehicle registration: WB
- Lok Sabha constituency: Jhargram
- Vidhan Sabha constituency: Salboni

Salboni (also written as Shalbani, Salbani) is a village in the Salboni CD block, in the Medinipur Sadar subdivision of the Paschim Medinipur district in the Indian state of West Bengal.

Salboni is the location of one of the Reserve Bank of India currency printing presses and the elite CoBRA BN of CRPF.

== History ==
Raja Horogobindo Banerjee, popularly known as Horo Thakur, succeeded his father Raja Dr. Keshab Chandra Banerjee and ruled the region. During his lifetime, Banerjee established several Sanskrit schools as well as a college called "Horogobindo Chatuspathi."

Horogobindo Chatuspathi is considered to have been a vibrant hub, having played host to an annual seminar that was nearly always attended by Acharya Vinobha Vabe.

During World War II, Salboni was the site of a Royal Air Force airfield (RAF Salbani).

British officers are buried in the Sal Tree Jungle in Salboni .

== Geography ==
Cities and towns in Medinpur Sadar subdivision of Paschim Medinipur district
M: municipal city/ town, CT: census town, R: rural/ urban centre, H: historical/ religious centre, F: facilities
Owing to space constraints in the small map, the actual locations in a larger map may vary slightly

=== Location ===
Salboni is located in West Bengal at the coordinates of 22.5654°N 87.1548°E.

It has an average elevation of 25 metres (85 feet). It is on NH 60.

=== Area overview ===
Paschim Medinipur district (before separation of Jhargram) had a total forest area of 1,700 km^{2}, accounting for 14.31% of the total forested area of the state. It is obvious from the map of the Midnapore Sadar subdivision, placed alongside, is that there are large stretches of forests in the subdivision. The soil is predominantly lateritic. Around 30% of the population of the district resides in this subdivision. 13.95% of the population lives in urban areas and 86.05% in the rural areas.

Note: The map alongside presents some of the notable locations in the subdivision. All places marked in the map are linked in the larger full screen map.

== Demographics ==
According to the 2011 Census of India Salboni had a population of 3,963, of which 1,973 (50%) were males and 1,990 (50%) females. Population in the age range 0-6 years was 371. The total number of literate persons in Salboni was 3,080 (77.72% of the population over 6 years).

.*For language details see Salboni (community development block)#Language and religion

== Civic administration ==
=== CD block HQ ===
The headquarters of Salboni block are located at Salboni.

=== Police station ===
Salboni police station has jurisdiction over Salboni CD block.

== Economy ==
Bharatiya Reserve Bank Note Mudran Private Limited, a wholly owned subsidiary of the Reserve Bank of India, has banknote printing presses at Salboni and Mysore with a capacity of 16 billion note pieces per year.

On 11 January 2007 JSW Steel had announced plans to construct a 10 million tonne steel plant in Salboni. Construction costs were estimated to be around 35,000 crore(5,3 million dollars). The plant was to be built on a 4300-acre plot of which 4000 acres were barren government land, 300 acres were bought from locals and 134 acres of the land was purposed for a cement plant. Unable to secure iron ore linkage, local villagers became disillusioned with the construction plans, as the projected economic boost failed to materialize. In 2014, JSW Steel announced that it would be returning 300 acres of land back to their original owners. After statements by the government that it would take back its land if it were left unused, JSW Steel announced in early 2016 that they were to build a cement plant and a power plant, and are looking to expand their plans where possible.

== Transport ==
Salboni is well connected with major towns in the district by road. Salboni railway station is situated on Kharagpur–Bankura–Adra line of South Eastern railway division.

== Healthcare ==
Salboni Super Speciality Hospital, with 200 beds at Salboni, is the major government medical facility in the Salboni CD block.
