= Godapiasal =

- Village
- Location in West Bengal, India Godapiasal (India)
- Coordinates: 22°31′48.9″N 87°19′45.2″E
- Country: India
- State: West Bengal
- District: Paschim Medinipur

Population (2011)
  - Total: 2,366

Languages*
  - Official: Bengali, Santali, English
- Time zone: UTC+5:30 (IST)
- Lok Sabha constituency: Jhargram
- Vidhan Sabha constituency: Salboni
- Website: paschimmedinipur.gov.in

Godapiasal is a village in the Salboni CD block in the Medinipur Sadar subdivision of the Paschim Medinipur district in the state of West Bengal, India.

== Geography ==
Cities and towns in Medinpur Sadar subdivision of Paschim Medinipur district
M: municipal city/ town, CT: census town, R: rural/ urban centre, H: historical/ religious centre, F: facilities
Owing to space constraints in the small map, the actual locations in a larger map may vary slightly

=== Location ===
Godapaisal is located at 22°31′48.9″N 87°19′45.2″E.

=== Area overview ===
Paschim Medinipur district (before separation of Jhargram) had a total forest area of 1,700 km^{2} (660 sq mi), accounting for 14.31% of the total forested area of the state. It is obvious from the map of the Midnapore Sadar subdivision, placed alongside, is that there are large stretches of forests in the subdivision. The soil is predominantly lateritic. Around 30% of the population of the district resides in this subdivision. 13.95% of the population lives in urban areas and 86.05% lives in the rural areas.

Note: The map alongside presents some of the notable locations in the subdivision. All places marked in the map are linked in the larger full screen map.

== Demographics ==
According to the 2011 Census of India Godapiasal had a total population of 1,387 of which 705 (51%) were males and 682 (49%) were females. Population in the age range 0–6 years was 156. The total number of literate persons in Godapiasal was 812 (58.54% of the population over 6 years).

.*For language details see Salboni (community development block)#Language and religion

== Economy ==
OCL India Ltd. (Dalmia Group) commissioned its cement grinding unit at Salboni in 2014. The plant is at Kilapachuria village near Godapiasal.

JSW Cement, had proposed construction of a 2.5 million tonnes slag based cement plant at Salboni. It was initially a part of the now stalled steel project. It proposes to utilise only 135 acres of land for the cement plant and is only a small portion of the land it has been holding since 2008. The land is near Godapiasal Forest.

A Rs. 800 crore project, 2.4 million tonnes per year cement plant of JSW was inaugurated by Mamata Banerjee, Chief Minister of West Bengal, in January 2018.

== Transport ==
Godapiasal railway station is situated on the Kharagpur-Adra line of South Eastern Railway.

NH 14, (old numbering NH 60), running from Morgram to Kharagpur, passes through Godapiasal.

== Education ==
=== Schools ===
- Godapiasal Mahatma Gandhi Memorial High School
- Godapiasal Charubala Balika Vidyalaya
