= Shrirampur, Paschim Medinipur =

Shrirampur
- Village
- Location in West Bengal, India Shrirampur (India)
- Coordinates: 22.2215°N 87.5840°E
- Country: India
- State: West Bengal
- District: Paschim Medinipur

Population (2011)
  - Total: 933

Languages*
  - Official: Bengali, Santali, English
- Time zone: UTC+5:30 (IST)
- PIN: 721144 (Sabang)
- Telephone/STD code: 03228
- Lok Sabha constituency: Ghatal
- Vidhan Sabha constituency: Sabang
- Website: paschimmedinipur.gov.in

Shrirampur is a village in the Sabang CD block in the Kharagpur subdivision of the Paschim Medinipur district in the state of West Bengal, India.

== Geography ==
Cities and towns in the southern portion of Kharagpur subdivision (including Dantan I & II, Mohanpur, Keshiary, Narayangarh and Sabang CD blocks) of Paschim Medinipur district
CT: census town, R: rural/ urban centre, H: historical/ religious centre
Owing to space constraints in the small map, the actual locations in a larger map may vary slightly

=== Location ===
Shrirampur is located at 22.2215°N 87.5840°E.

=== Area overview ===
Kharagpur subdivision, shown partly in the map alongside, mostly has alluvial soils, except in two CD blocks in the west – Kharagpur I and Keshiary, which mostly have lateritic soils. Around 74% of the total cultivated area is cropped more than once. With a density of population of 787 per km^{2}nearly half of the district's population resides in this subdivision. 14.33% of the population lives in urban areas and 86.67% lives in the rural areas.

Note: The map alongside presents some of the notable locations in the subdivision. All places marked in the map are linked in the larger full screen map.

== Demographics ==
According to the 2011 Census of India, Shrirampur had a total population of 933, of which 489 (52%) were males and 444 (48%) were females. There were 100 persons in the age range of 0–6 years. The total number of literate persons in Shrirampur was 778 (93.40% of the population over 6 years).

.*For language details see Sabang (community development block)#Language and religion

== Culture ==
David J. McCutchion mentions the Lakshmi Janardana temple of the Jana family as a richly terracotta decorated pancharatna with smooth rekha turrets measuring 17’ 8" square, built in 1870.

== Education ==
=== Schools in Shrirampur ===
Shrirampur village has four government pre-primary schools and four government primary schools.

The village does not have any private or government middle schools. However, a private middle school is available in Komarpur, located less than 5 kilometers away.

Similarly, there are no private or government secondary schools in Shrirampur, but a private secondary school operates in Komarpur, also less than 5 kilometers away.

For senior secondary education, Shrirampur lacks both private and government senior secondary schools. Students typically attend a private senior secondary school in Lachipur, situated within 5 kilometers of the village.

== Shrirampur picture gallery ==
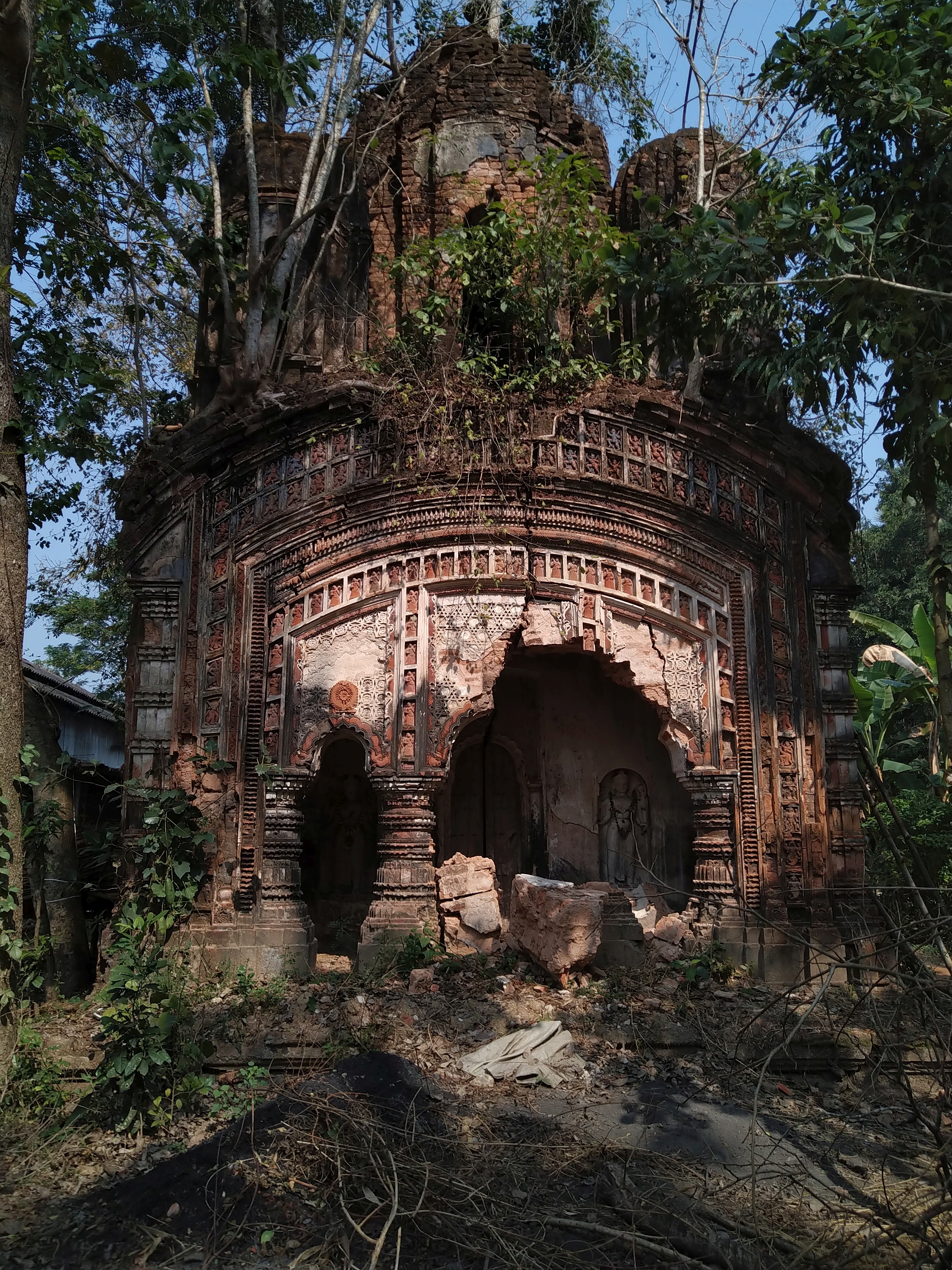
Lakshmi Janardana temple

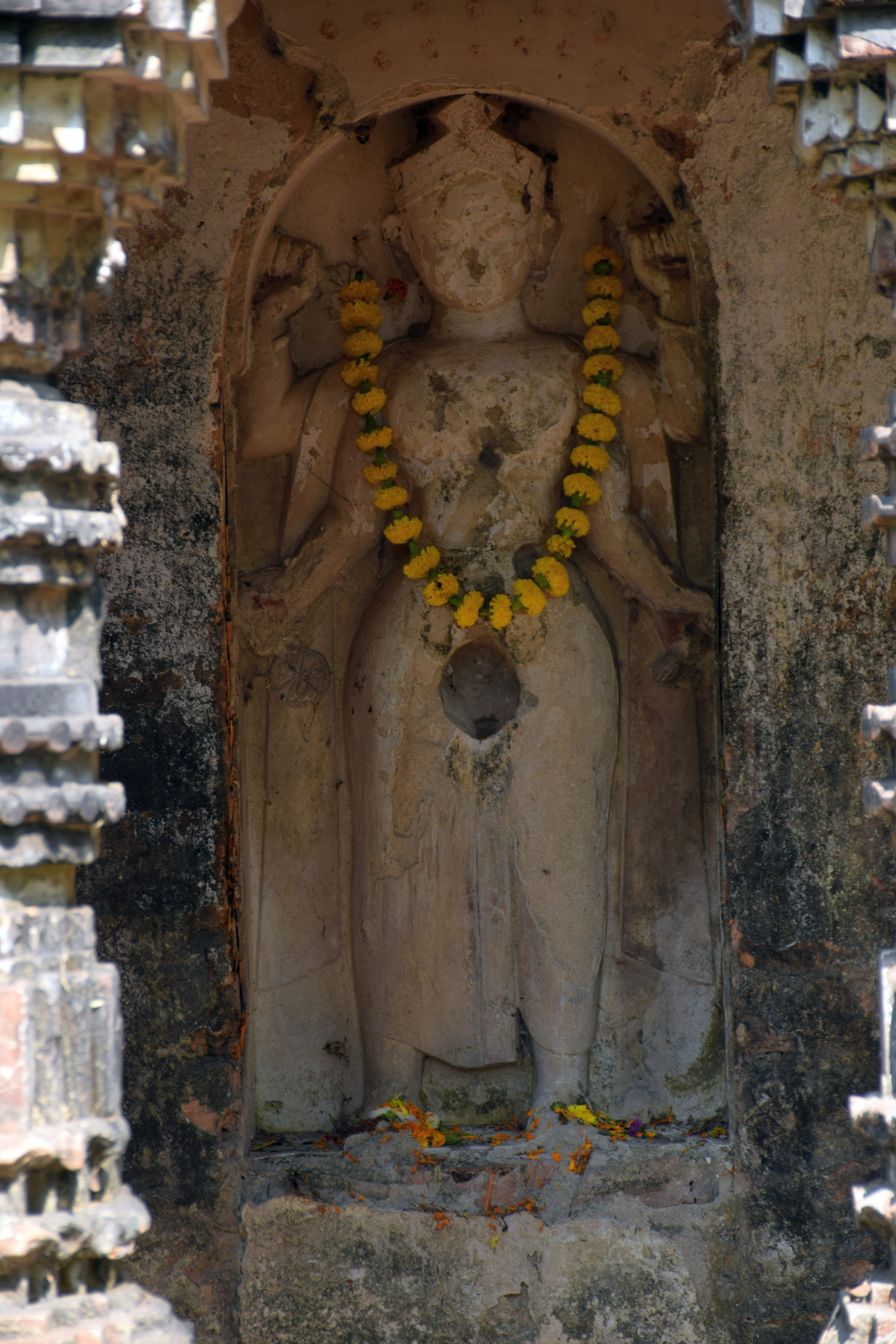
Terracotta decoration

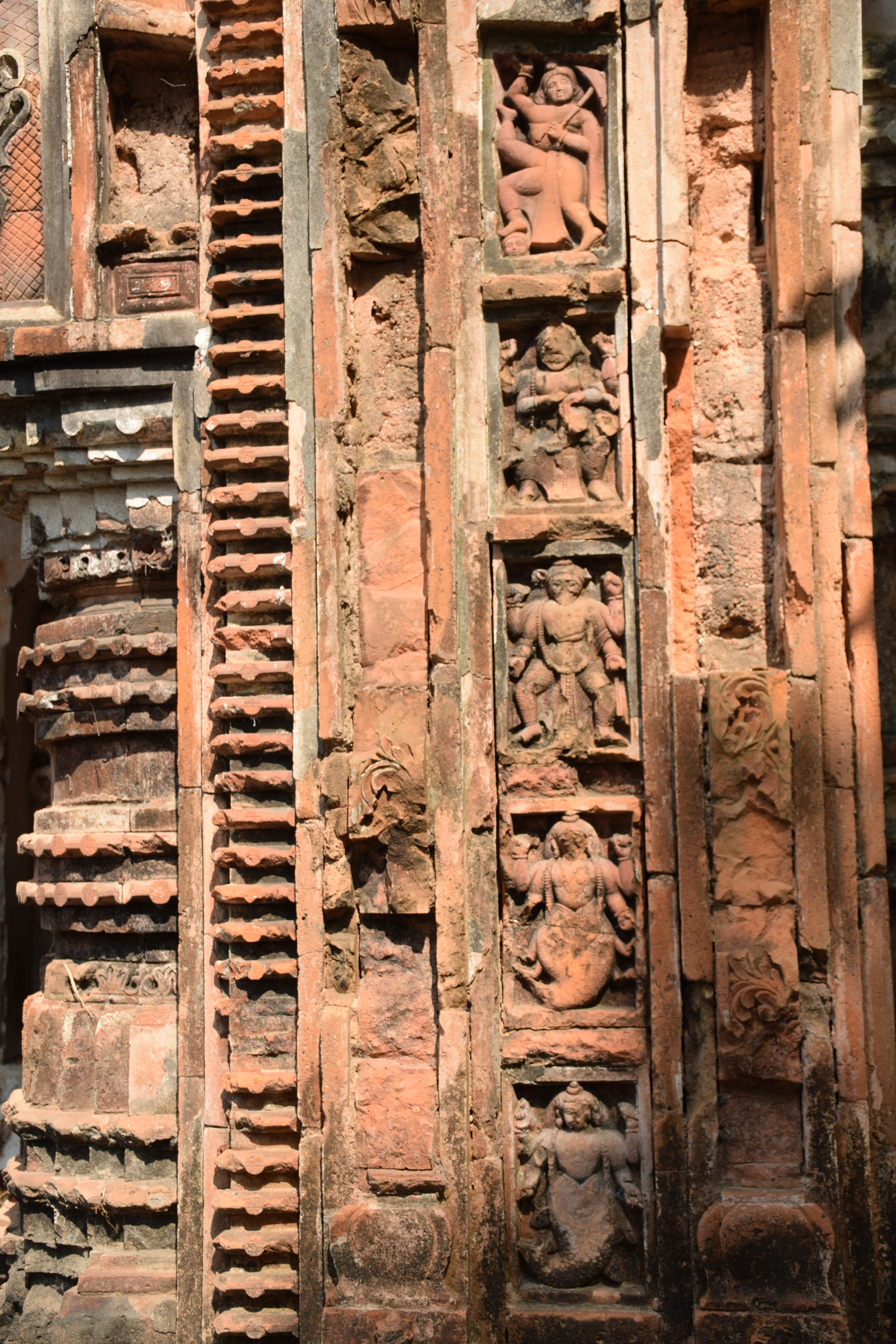
Terracotta decoration

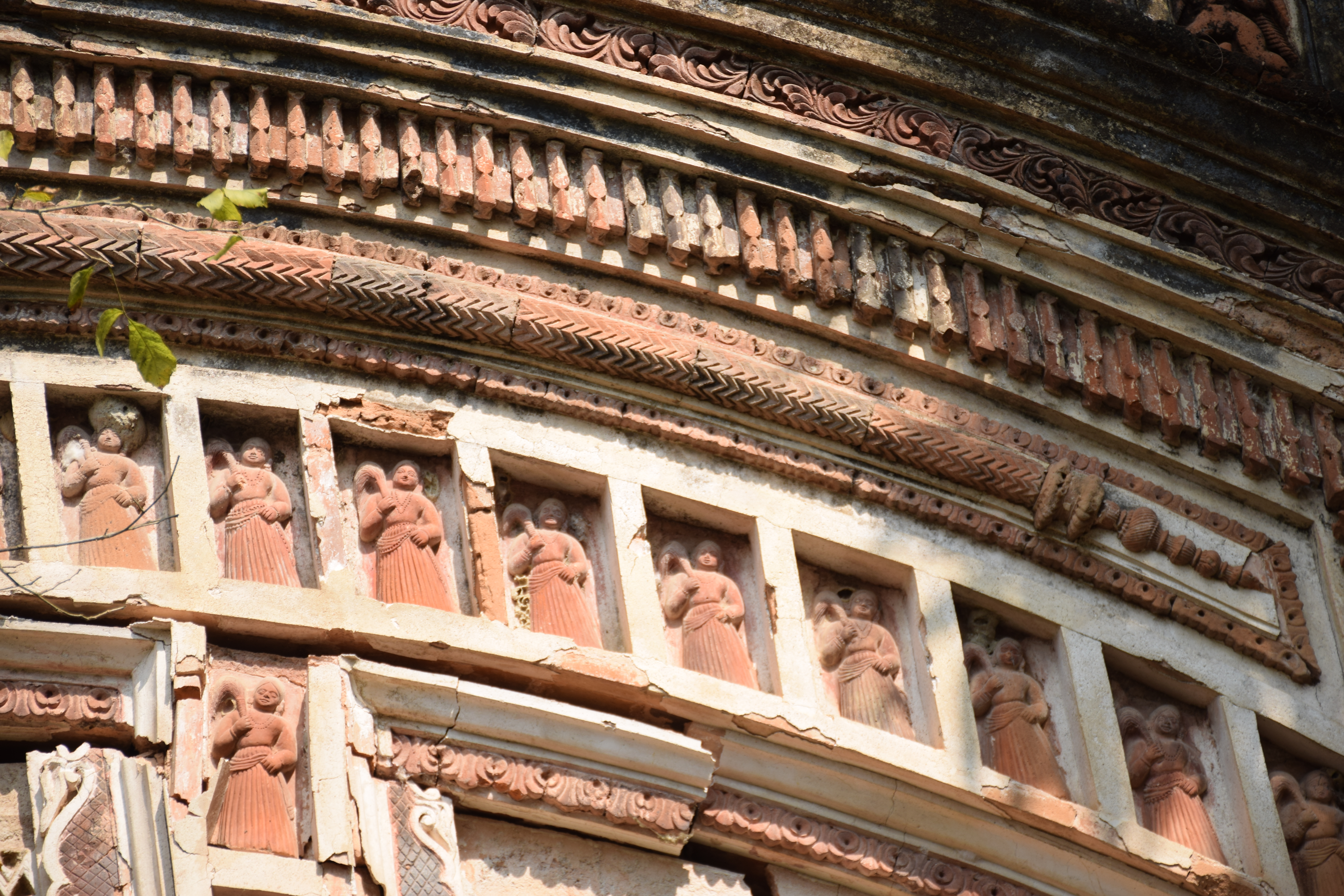
Terracotta decoration
