= Kolanda, Paschim Medinipur =

Kolanda
- Village
- Location in West Bengal, India Kolanda (India)
- Coordinates: 22.0946°N 87.5257°E
- Country: India
- State: West Bengal
- District: Paschim Medinipur

Population (2011)
  - Total: 1,520

Languages
  - Official: Bengali, Santali, English
- Time zone: UTC+5:30 (IST)
- PIN: 721467
- Telephone/STD code: 03228
- Lok Sabha constituency: Ghatal
- Vidhan Sabha constituency: Sabang
- Website: paschimmedinipur.gov.in

Kolanda is a village in the Sabang CD block in the Kharagpur subdivision of the Paschim Medinipur district in the state of West Bengal, India.

== Geography ==
Cities and towns in the southern portion of Kharagpur subdivision (including Dantan I & II, Mohanpur, Keshiary, Narayangarh and Sabang CD blocks) of Paschim Medinipur district
CT: census town, R: rural/ urban centre, H: historical/ religious centre
Owing to space constraints in the small map, the actual locations in a larger map may vary slightly

=== Location ===
Kolanda is located at 22.0946°N 87.5257°E.

=== Area overview ===
Kharagpur subdivision, shown partly in the map alongside, mostly has alluvial soils, except in two CD blocks in the west – Kharagpur I and Keshiary, which mostly have lateritic soils. Around 74% of the total cultivated area is cropped more than once. With a density of population of 787 per km^{2}nearly half of the district's population resides in this subdivision. 14.33% of the population lives in urban areas and 86.67% lives in the rural areas.

Note: The map alongside presents some of the notable locations in the subdivision. All places marked in the map are linked in the larger full screen map.

== Demographics ==
According to the 2011 Census of India, Kolanda had a total population of 1,520, of which 763 (50%) were males and 757 (50%) were females. There were 200 persons in the age range of 0–6 years. The total number of literate persons in Kolanda was 1,320 (86.14% of the population over 6 years).

.*For language details see Sabang (community development block)#Language and religion

== Kolanda picture gallery ==
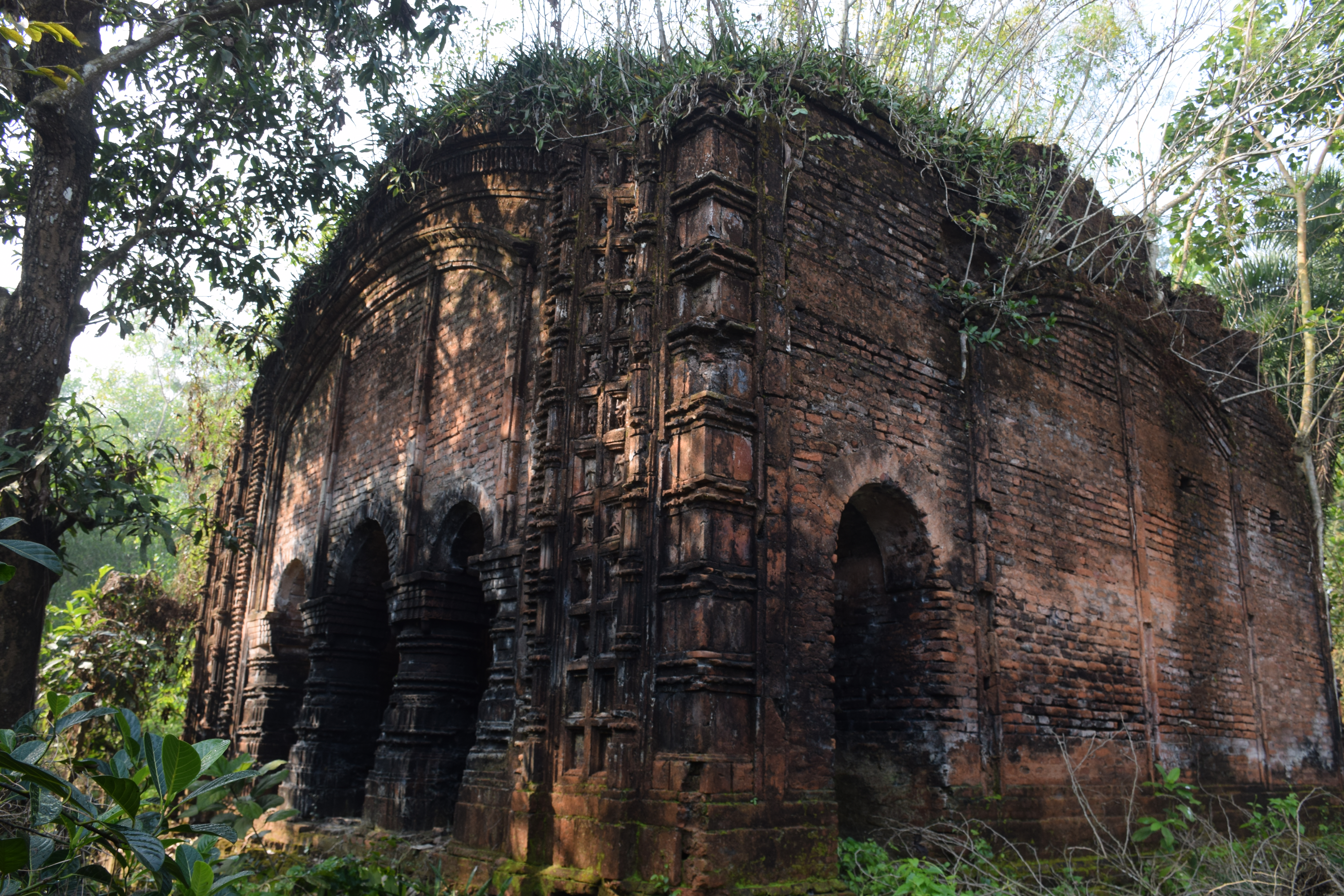
Pancha ratna Shyama Sundara temple – all five pinnacles have fallen

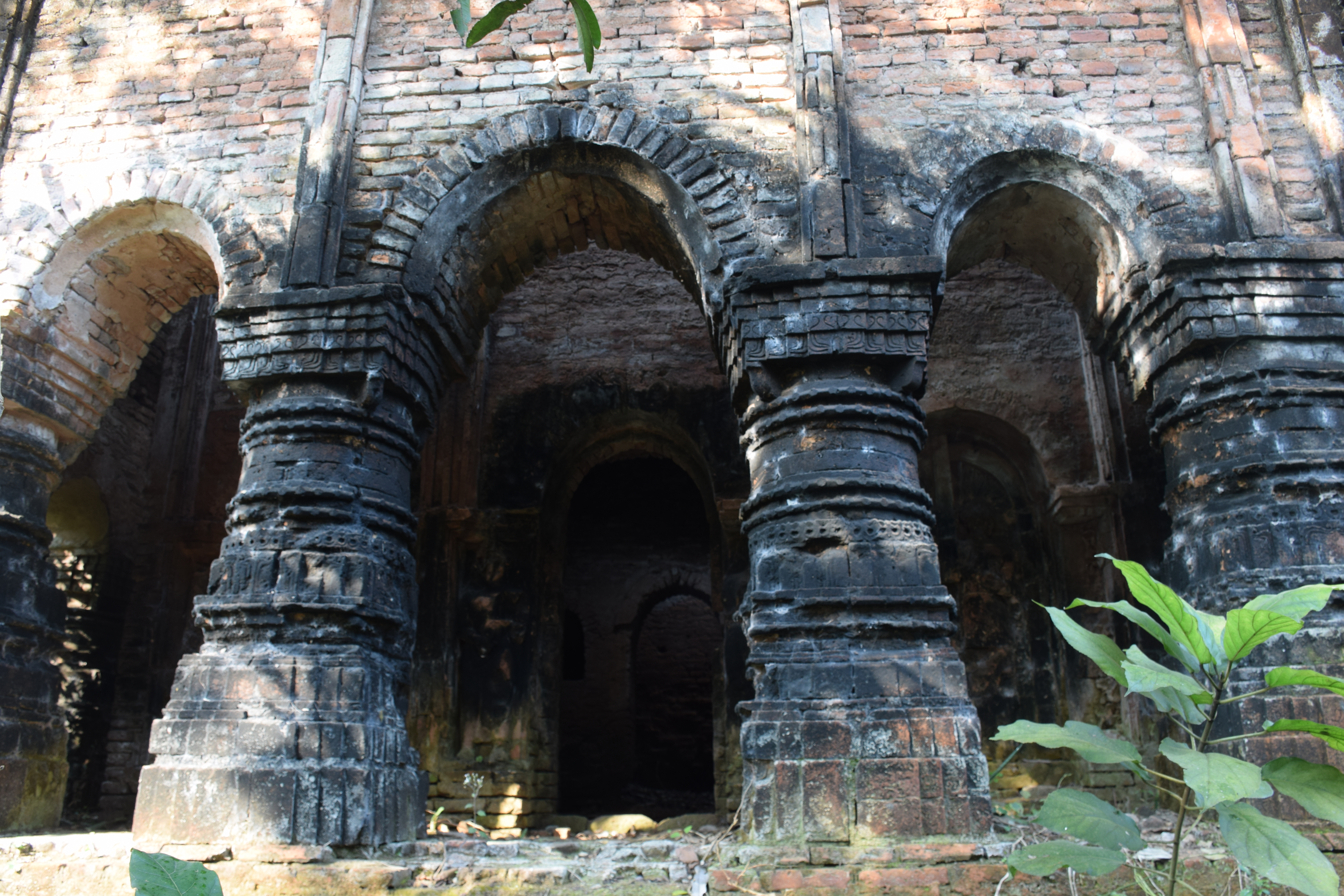
Shyama Sundara temple

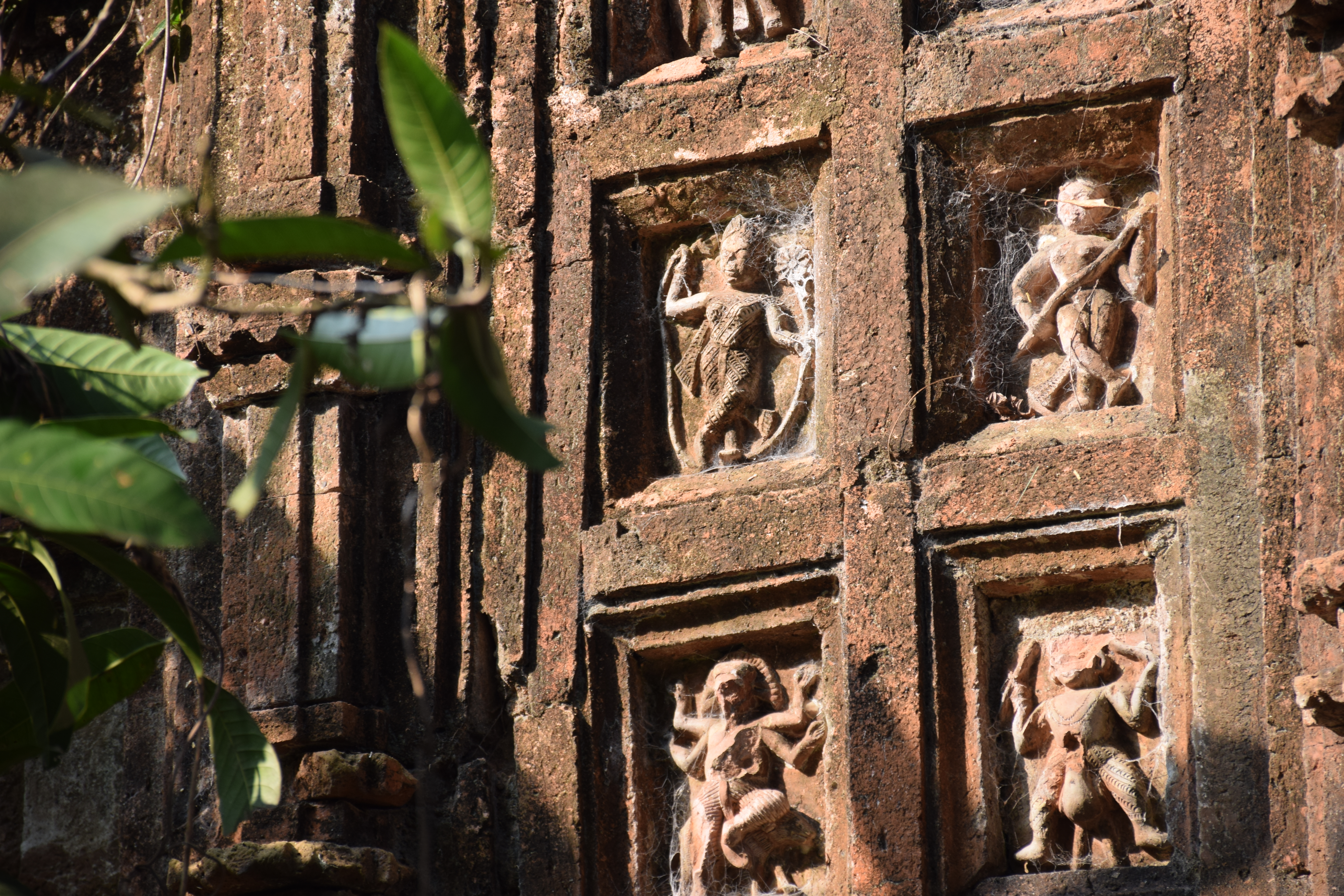
Terracotta relief in Shyama Sundara temple
