= Salboni (community development block) =

- Community development block
- Coordinates: 22°38′36.2″N 87°19′6.2″E
- Country: India
- State: West Bengal
- District: Paschim Medinipur

Government
  - Type: Federal democracy

Area
  - Total: 553.39 km^{2} (213.67 sq mi)
- Elevation: 41 m (135 ft)

Population (2011)
  - Total: 188,563
  - Density: 340.74/km^{2} (882.52/sq mi)

Languages
  - Official: Bengali, Santali, English
- Time zone: UTC+5:30 (IST)
- PIN: 721147 (Salboni); 721129 (Godapiasal)
- Area code: 03227
- Vehicle registration: WB-34
- Literacy: 74.87%
- Lok Sabha constituency: Jhargram, Medinipur
- Vidhan Sabha constituency: Salboni, Medinipur
- Website: paschimmedinipur.gov.in

Salboni is a community development block that forms an administrative division in Medinipur Sadar subdivision of Paschim Medinipur district in the Indian state of West Bengal.

== History ==
=== Red corridor ===
106 districts spanning 10 states across India, described as being part of the Left wing extremism activities, constitutes the Red corridor. In West Bengal the districts of Pashim Medinipur, Bankura, Purulia and Birbhum are part of the Red corridor. However, as of July 2016, there has been no reported incidents of Maoist related activities from these districts for the previous 4 years. In the period 2009-2011 LWE violence resulted in more than 500 deaths and a similar number missing in Paschim Medinipur district.

The Lalgarh movement, which started attracting attention after the failed assassination attempt on Buddhadeb Bhattacharjee, then chief minister of West Bengal, in the Salboni area of Paschim Medinipur district, on 2 November 2008 and the police action that followed, had also spread over to these areas. The movement was not just a political struggle but an armed struggle that concurrently took the look of a social struggle. A large number of CPI (M) activists were killed. Although the epi-centre of the movement was Lalgarh, it was spread across 19 police stations in three adjoining districts – Paschim Medinipur, Bankura and Purulia, all thickly forested and near the border with Jharkhand. The deployment of CRPF and other forces started on 11 June 2009. The movement came to an end after the 2011 state assembly elections and change of government in West Bengal. The death of Kishenji, the Maoist commander, on 24 November 2011 was the last major landmark.

From 2009 Maoist violence had rapidly spread across eleven western CD blocks of the district: Binpur I, Binpur II, Salboni, Grahbeta II, Jamboni, Jhargram, Midnapore Sadar, Gopiballavpur I, Gopiballavpur II, Sankrail and Nayagram.

== Geography ==
In Salboni CD block 80% of the cultivated area has infertile lateritic soil and 20% has alluvial soil. Salboni CD block is drought prone.

Salboni is located at 22°38′36.2″N 87°19′6.2″E.

Salbani CD block is bounded by Garhbeta II and Garhbeta III CD blocks in the north, Keshpur CD block in the east, Midnapore Sadar CD block in the south and Binpur I CD block in the west.

It is located 28 km from Midnapore, the district headquarters.

Salboni CD block has an area of 553.39 km^{2}. It has 1 panchayat samity, 10 gram panchayats, 134 gram sansads (village councils), 528 mouzas and 411 inhabited villages. Salboni police station serves this block. Headquarters of this CD block is at Salboni.

Salboni CD block had a forest cover of 18,688 hectares, against a total geographical area of 52,639 hectares in 2005-06.

Gram panchayats of Salboni block/ panchayat samiti are: Bankibundh, Bhimpur, Bishnupur, Debagram, Germal, Karnagarh, Kashijora, Lalgeria, Salboni and Satpathi.

== Demographics ==
=== Population ===
According to the 2011 Census of India Salbani CD block had a total population of 188,653, all of which were rural. There were 95,195 (50.46%) males and 93,458 (49.54%) females. Population in the age range 0-6 years was 23,070. Scheduled Castes numbered 35,095 (18.61%) and Scheduled Tribes numbered 32,771 (17.38%).

As per the 2001 census, Salboni block had a total population of 165,193, out of which 84,247 were males and 80,946 were females. Salboni block registered a population growth of 16.71 per cent during the 1991-2001 decade. Decadal growth for the combined Midnapore district was 14.87 per cent. Decadal growth in West Bengal was 17.45 per cent.

Villages in Salbani CD block include (2011 census figures in brackets): Salboni (3,963), Bankibandh (1,125), Bishnupur (1,639), Kashijora (1,409), Garmal (1,324), Satpati (2,360), Lalgere (1,099), Debagram (1,402) and Karnagarh (2,812).

=== Literacy ===
According to the 2011 census the total number of literates persons in Salbani CD block was 123,974 (74.87% of the population over 6 years) out of which males numbered 69,299 (82.89% of the male population over 6 years) and females numbered 54,675 (66.70% of the female population over 6 years). The gender gap in literacy rates was 16.19%.

See also – List of West Bengal districts ranked by literacy rate

Literacy in CD blocks of
Paschim Medinipur district
Jhargram subdivision
Binpur I – 69.74%
Binpur II – 70.46%
Gopiballavpur I – 65.44%
Gopiballavpur II – 71.40%
Jamboni – 72.63%
Jhargram – 72.23%
Nayagram – 63.70%
Sankrail – 73.35%
Medinipur Sadar subdivision
Garhbeta I – 72.21%
Garhbeta II – 75.87%
Garhbeta III – 73.42%
Keshpur – 77.88%
Midnapore Sadar – 70.48%
Salboni – 74.87%
Ghatal subdivision
Chandrakona I – 78.93%
Chandrakona II – 75.96%
Daspur I – 83.99%
Daspur II – 85.62%
Ghatal – 81.08%
Kharagpur subdivision
Dantan I – 73.53%
Dantan II – 82.45%
Debra – 82.03%
Keshiari – 76.78%
Kharagpur I – 77.06%
Kharagpur II – 76.08%
Mohanpur – 80.51%
Narayangarh – 78.31%
Pingla – 83.57%
Sabang – 86.84%
2011 Census: CD Block Wise

Primary Census Abstract Data

=== Language and religion ===
Religion in Salbani CD block (2011)
Hinduism	89.51%
Other (tribal religion)	6.37%
Islam	3.18%
Other or not stated	0.91%

In the 2011 census Hindus numbered 168,863 and formed 89.51% of the population in Salboni CD block. Muslims numbered 6,000 and formed 3.18% of the population. Others numbered 13,790 and formed 7.31% of the population. Others include Addi Bassi, Marang Boro, Santal, Saranath, Sari Dharma, Sarna, Alchchi, Bidin, Sant, Saevdharm, Seran, Saran, Sarin, Kheria, Christians and other religious communities. Christians and other religious communities. In 2001, Hindus were 88.15%, Muslims 2.84% and tribal religions 8.47% of the population respectively.

Languages of Salbani CD block (2011)
1. Bengali (83.9%)
2. Santali (11.6%)
3. Kurmali (3.60%)
4. Others (0.91%)

At the time of the 2011 census, 83.91% of the population spoke Bengali, 11.58% Santali and 3.60% Kurmali as their first language.

== BPL families ==
In Salboni CD block 36.11% families were living below poverty line in 2007.

According to the District Human Development Report of Paschim Medinipur: The 29 CD blocks of the district were classified into four categories based on the poverty ratio. Nayagram, Binpur II and Jamboni CD blocks have very high poverty levels (above 60%). Kharagpur I, Kharagpur II, Sankrail, Garhbeta II, Pingla and Mohanpur CD blocks have high levels of poverty (50-60%), Jhargram, Midnapore Sadar, Dantan I, Gopiballavpur II, Binpur I, Dantan II, Keshiari, Chandrakona I, Gopiballavpur I, Chandrakona II, Narayangarh, Keshpur, Ghatal, Sabang, Garhbeta I, Salboni, Debra and Garhbeta III CD blocks have moderate levels of poverty (25-50%) and Daspur II and Daspur I CD blocks have low levels of poverty (below 25%).

== Economy ==
=== Infrastructure ===
409 or 77% of mouzas in Salboni CD block were electrified by 31 March 2014.

409 mouzas in Salboni CD block had drinking water facilities in 2013-14. There were 95 fertiliser depots, 37 seed stores and 48 fair price shops in the CD block.

=== Jindal Steel Plant ===
JSW Steel Ltd signed a memorandum of agreement with the Government of West Bengal, on 11 January 2007 for setting up a steel plant at Salboni. The first phase of the proposed 10 million tonnes per annum steel plant was to have a capacity of 3 million tonnes per annuum and was scheduled to be completed in the succeeding four years. The state government agreed to provide 4,300 acres of land on lease. The project was delayed for various reasons and issues like land and water were sorted out. On 28 April 2013, the company made it clear that it was not going to move any further without sorting out the issue of supply of iron ore for the steel plant. The company does not have any captive iron ore mines. Additionally there are some problems with coal supplies and a global over production of steel. The steel plant was officially put on hold in December 2014.

=== Industry ===
Bharatiya Reserve Bank Note Mudran Private Limited, a wholly owned subsidiary of the Reserve Bank of India, has note printing presses at Salboni and Mysore with a capacity of 16 billion note pieces per year.

OCL India Ltd. (Dalmia Group) commissioned its cement grinding unit at Salboni in 2014. The plant is at Kilapachuria village near Godapiasal.

JSW Cement, had proposed construction of a 2.5 million tonnes slag based cement plant at Salboni. It was initially a part of the now stalled steel project. It proposes to utilise only 135 acres of land for the cement plant and is only a small portion of the land it has been holding since 2008. The land is near Godapiasal Forest.

A Rs. 800 crore project, 2.4 million tonnes per year cement plant of JSW was inaugurated by Mamata Banerjee, Chief Minister of West Bengal, in January 2018.

=== Agriculture ===
Persons engaged in agriculture
in Salboni CD block
1. Bargadars (10.5%)
2. Patta holders (30.7%)
3. Small farmers (2.91%)
4. Marginal farmers (19.6%)
5. Agricultural labourers (36.2%)

Although the Bargadari Act of 1950 recognised the rights of bargadars to a higher share of crops from the land that they tilled, it was not implemented fully. Large tracts, beyond the prescribed limit of land ceiling, remained with the rich landlords. From 1977 onwards major land reforms took place in West Bengal. Land in excess of land ceiling was acquired and distributed amongst the peasants. Following land reforms land ownership pattern has undergone transformation. In 2013-14, persons engaged in agriculture in Salboni CD block could be classified as follows: bargadars 10.54%, patta (document) holders 30.72%, small farmers (possessing land between 1 and 2 hectares) 2.91%, marginal farmers (possessing land up to 1 hectare) 19.61% and agricultural labourers 36.22%.

In 2005-06 the nett cropped area in Salboni CD block was 17,572 hectares and the area in which more than one crop was grown was 12,427 hectares.

The extension of irrigation has played a role in growth of the predominantly agricultural economy. In 2013-14, the total area irrigated in Salboni CD block was 11,910 hectares, out of which 1,450 hectares were irrigated by canal water, 2,325 hectares by tank water, 960 hectares by deep tubewells, 2,600 hectares by shallow tube wells, 300 hectares by river lift irrigation, 1,375 hectares by open dug wells and 2,900 hectares by other methods.

In 2013-14, Salboni CD block produced 37,047 tonnes of Aman paddy, the main winter crop, from 21,161 hectares, 10,185 tonnes of Aus paddy (summer crop) from 4,000 hectares, 3,139 tonnes of Boro paddy (spring crop) from 929 hectares, 2,019 tonnes of wheat from 667 hectares and 33,776 tonnes of potatoes from 2,471 hectares. It also produced oilseeds.

=== Banking ===
In 2013-14, Salboni CD block had offices of 15 commercial banks and 1 gramin bank.

== Transport ==
Salboni CD block has 4 originating/ terminating bus routes.

The Kharagpur-Bankura-Adra line of South Eastern Railway passes through this CD block and there are stations at Salboni and Godapiasal.

National Highway 14, (old numbering NH 60), running from Morgram (in Murshidabad district) to Kharagpur (in Paschim Medinipur district), passes through this CD block.

== Education ==
Lt. Biswanath Pande was the first graduate and masters Degree holder of shalboni in British India. He did his Graduation as well as masters from University of Calcutta.

In 2013-14, Salboni CD block had 168 primary schools with 10,576 students, 19 middle schools with 1,353 students, 4 high schools with 2,103 students and 22 higher secondary schools with 19,138 students. Salboni CD block had 515 institutions for special and non-formal education with 15,195 students.

The United Nations Development Programme considers the combined primary and secondary enrolment ratio as the simple indicator of educational achievement of the children in the school going age. The infrastructure available is important. In Salboni CD block out of the total 168 primary schools in 2008-2009, 82 had pucca buildings, 11 partially pucca, 1 kucha and 74 multiple type.

Salboni Government College, established in 2011, is a degree college affiliated to Vidyasagar University.

== Culture ==
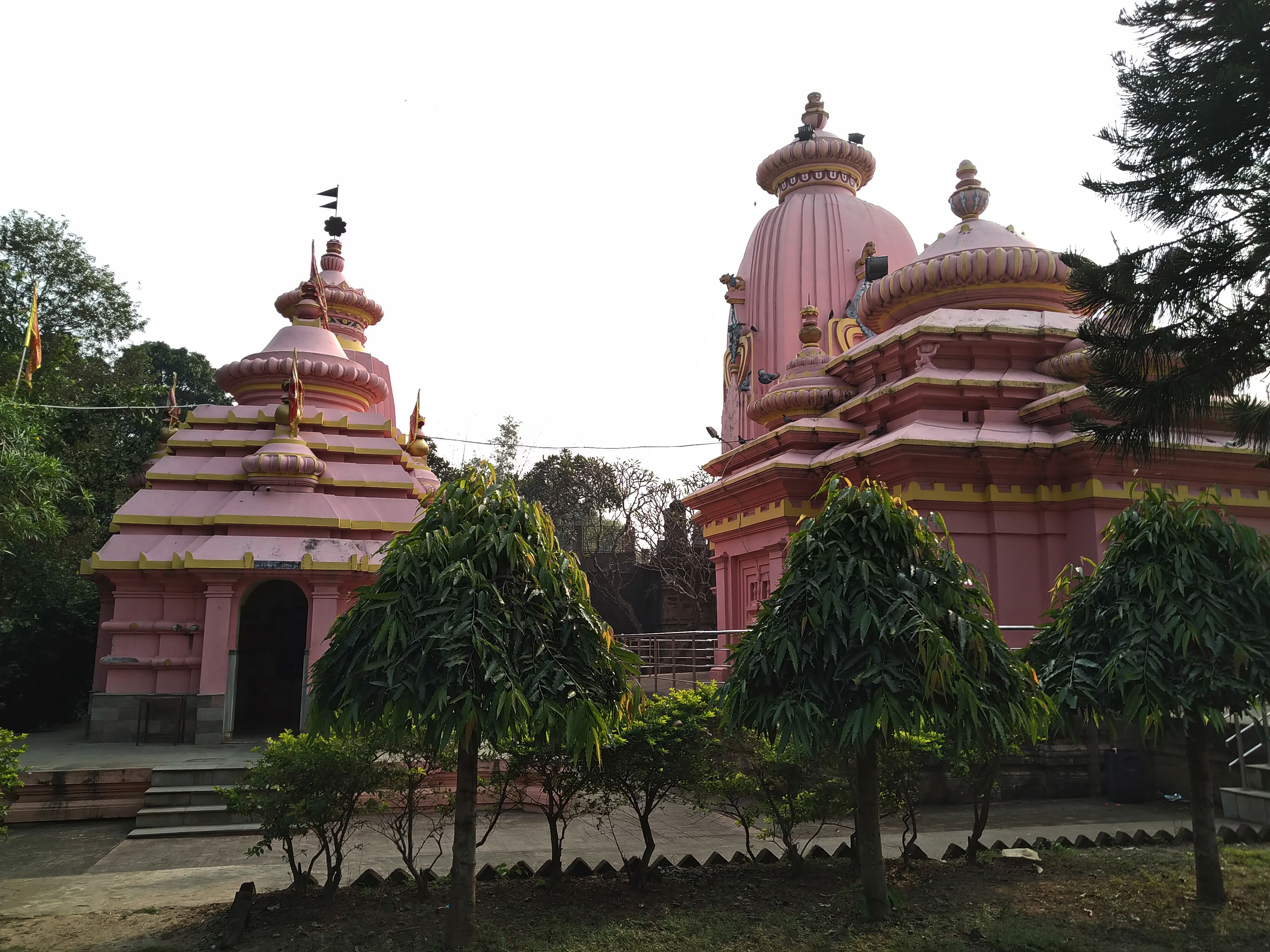
Karnagarh: Anadilinga Dandeshwar and Devi Bhagabati Mahamaya temples

The kings of Karnagarh ruled over a zamindari that included Midnapore and the surrounding areas. While the fort is in ruins, the temples are still standing.

== Healthcare ==
In 2014, Salboni CD block had one rural hospital, three primary health centres, one central government/ PSU medical institution and one private nursing home with total 115 beds and 16 doctors. It had 35 family welfare sub centres and one family welfare centre. 6,100 patients were treated indoors and 147,811 patients were treated outdoors in the hospitals, health centres and subcentres of the CD block.

Salboni Super Speciality Hospital, with 300 beds at Salboni, is the major government medical facility in the Salboni CD block. There are primary health centres at Godapiasal (with 10 beds), Bhimpur (with 6 beds) and Pirakata (with 4 beds).
