= Shankar Dolai =

Indian politician

Member of the West Bengal Legislative Assembly
- In office 2011–2021
- Preceded by: Ratan Pakhira
- Succeeded by: Sital Kapat
- Constituency: Ghatal (SC)

Personal details
- Born: 3 January 1958 (age 68)
- Party: All India Trinamool Congress
- Education: College affiliated with University of Calcutta
- Occupation: Social worker
- Profession: Politician

Shankar Dolai (3 January 1958) is an Indian politician from West Bengal. He is a former member of the West Bengal Legislative Assembly from Ghatal Assembly constituency, which is reserved for Scheduled Caste community, in Paschim Medinipur district. He was elected in the 2016 West Bengal Legislative Assembly election representing the All India Trinamool Congress.

== Early life and education ==
Dolai is from Ghatal, Paschim Medinipur district, West Bengal. He is the son of late Haripada Dolai. He completed his graduation in arts at a college affiliated with the University of Calcutta.

== Career ==
Dolai was elected in the Ghatal Assembly constituency representing the All India Trinamool Congress in the 2016 West Bengal Legislative Assembly election. He polled 107,682 votes and defeated his nearest rival, Kamal Chandra Dolui of the Communist Party of India (Marxist), by a margin of 19,479 votes. He first became an MLA winning the 2011 West Bengal Legislative Assembly election. In 2011, he polled 101,355 votes and defeated his nearest rival, Chhabi Pakhira of the Communist Party of India (Marxist), by a margin of 16,277 votes. However, his attempt to win for a third time was foiled by Sital Kapat of the Bharatiya Janata Party, who won the 2021 West Bengal Legislative Assembly election defeating Dolai, by a margin of 966 votes.
