= Kharar =

Kharar may refer to:

- Kharar, Ghatal, a town in West Bengal
- Kharar, SAS Nagar, a municipal council in Sahibzada Ajit Singh Nagar district, Punjab, India
  - Kharar Assembly Constituency
