= Ghatal Vidyasagar High School =

Location
- Ghatal, West Bengal; India
- Coordinates: 22°39′46.40″N 87°43′48.67″E

Information
- Type: School
- Established: 1882
- School district: Paschim Medinipur
- Affiliations: WBBSE & WBCHSE

Ghatal Vidyasagar High School is a co-ed higher secondary School in the sub-division Ghatal, Paschim Medinipur, West Bengal, India, established in 1882 by Pandit Ishwarchandra Vidyasagar, who donated 500 rupees to establish the school. It is a model and heritage school.

The school follows the course curricula of West Bengal Board of Secondary Education and West Bengal Council of Higher Secondary Education for standard 10th and 12th board examinations, respectively. It is located in Ghatal municipality about 600m from Ghatal Central bus stand.

This school is situated in the bank of river Shilabati.
