= Ghatal Assembly constituency =

Ghatal
- Constituency No. 231 for the West Bengal Legislative Assembly
- Interactive Map Outlining Ghatal Assembly Constituency

Constituency details
- Country: India
- Region: East India
- State: West Bengal
- District: Paschim Medinipur
- Lok Sabha constituency: Ghatal
- Established: 1951
- Total electors: 224,485
- Reservation: SC

Member of Legislative Assembly
- 18th West Bengal Legislative Assembly
- Incumbent Sital Kapat
- Party: BJP
- Alliance: NDA
- Elected year: 2026

Ghatal Assembly constituency is an assembly constituency in Paschim Medinipur district in the Indian state of West Bengal. It is reserved for scheduled castes.

Most Successful parties from Ghatal assembly
1. Communist Party of India (12 times) (66.7%)
2. Indian National Congress (2 times) (11.1%)
3. All India Trinamool Congress (2 time) (11.1%)
4. Bharatiya Janata Party (2 times) (11.1%)

== Overview ==
As per orders of the Delimitation Commission, No. 231. Ghatal Assembly constituency (SC) is composed of the following: Ghatal municipality, Ghatal community development block, Ghatal Kharar municipality, and Rajnagar, Sarberia I and Sarberia II gram panchayats of Daspur I community development block.

Ghatal Assembly constituency (SC) is part of No. 32 Ghatal (Lok Sabha constituency). It was earlier part of Arambagh (Lok Sabha constituency).

== Members of the Legislative Assembly ==
Year	Member	Party
1952	Amulyacharan Dal	Communist Party of India
1952	Jatishchandra Ghosh	Communist Party of India
1957	Harendra Nath Dolui	Indian National Congress
1957	Lakshman Chandra Sarkar	Indian National Congress
1962	Nagen Dolai	Communist Party of India
1967	Nandarani Dal	Communist Party of India
1969	Nandarani Dal	Communist Party of India
1971	Nandarani Dal	Communist Party of India
1972	Harisadhan Dolui	Indian National Congress
1977	Gopal Mandal	Communist Party of India
1982	Gopal Mandal	Communist Party of India
1987	Ratan Pakhira	Communist Party of India
1991	Ratan Pakhira	Communist Party of India
1996	Ratan Pakhira	Communist Party of India
2001	Ratan Pakhira	Communist Party of India
2006	Ratan Pakhira	Communist Party of India
2011	Shankar Dolai	All India Trinamool Congress
2016	Shankar Dolai	All India Trinamool Congress
2021	Sital Kapat	Bharatiya Janata Party
2026	Sital Kapat	Bharatiya Janata Party

== Election results ==
=== 2026 ===
2026 West Bengal Legislative Assembly election: Ghatal
Party	Candidate	Votes	%	±%
BJP	Sital Kapat	131,550	54.35	▲7.4
AITC	Shyamali Sardar	93,893	38.79	▼7.73
CPI(M)	Santi Nath Satick	9,352	3.86	▼0.65
NOTA	None of the above	1,308	0.54	▼0.04
Majority		37,657	15.56	▲15.13
Turnout		242,025	87.44	▲6.92
BJP hold		Swing		

=== 2021 ===
West Bengal assembly elections, 2021: Ghatal
Party	Candidate	Votes	%	±%
BJP	Sital Kapat	105,812	46.95	
AITC	Shankar Dolai	104,846	46.52	
CPI(M)	Kamal Chandra Dolui	10,165	4.51	
NOTA	None of the above	1,305	0.58	
Majority		966	0.43	
Turnout		225,375	80.52	
BJP gain from AITC		Swing		

=== 2016 ===
West Bengal assembly elections, 2016: Ghatal
Party	Candidate	Votes	%	±%
AITC	Shankar Dolai	107,682	49.77	▼2.47
CPI(M)	Kamal Chandra Dolui	88,203	40.76	▼3.09
BJP	Anjushree Dolui	10,468	4.84	▲2.48
Independent	Tanmoy Dolui	5,164	2.39	
SUCI(C)	Anjan Jana	2,564	1.19	
NOTA	None of the above	2,290	1.06	
Majority		19,479	9	▲0.61
Turnout		216,371	84.14	▼2.38
AITC hold		Swing		

=== 2011 ===
West Bengal assembly elections, 2011: Ghatal
Party	Candidate	Votes	%	±%
AITC	Shankar Dolai	101,355	52.24	
CPI(M)	Chhabi Pakhira	85,078	43.85	
BJP	Ashok Malik	4,584	2.36	
PDS	Mahitosh Bauri	2,984	1.54	
Majority		16,277	8.39	
Turnout		194,001	86.42	
AITC gain from CPI(M)		Swing		

=== 2006 ===
In 2006, 2001, 1996, 1991 and 1987 state assembly elections, Ratan Pakhira of CPI(M) won the 197 Ghatal (SC) assembly seat defeating his nearest rivals, Ayan Dolui of BJP in 2006, Gopal Karak of Trinamool Congress in 2001, Rajani Kanta Dolui of Congress in 1996, Nimai Bag of Congress in 1991, and Madhu Sudan Dolai in 1987. Contests in most years were multi cornered but only winners and runners are being mentioned. Gopal Mandal of CPI(M) defeated Nimai Bag of Congress in 1982. Gopal Mandal of CPI(M) defeated Baneshwar Saha of Janata Party.

=== 1972 ===
Harisadhan Dolui of Congress won in 1972. Nandarani Dal of CPI(M) won in 1971, 1969 and 1967. Nagen Dolai of CPI won in 1962. In 1957 and 1951 Ghatal had a dual seat. Harendra Nath Dolai and Lakshman Chandra Sarkar, both of Congress won in 1957. Amulya Charan Dal and Jatish Chandra Ghosh, both of CPI, won the Ghatal dual seat in independent India's first election in 1951.
