= Ghatal =

Town in West Bengal, India

- Town
- Location in West Bengal, India Ghatal (India)
- Coordinates: 22.67°N 87.72°E
- Country: India
- State: West Bengal
- District: Paschim Medinipur

Government
  - Type: Municipality
  - Body: Ghatal Municipality
  - MP: Deepak Adhikari (Dev)
  - MLA: Sital Kapat

Area
  - Total: 10.40 km^{2} (4.02 sq mi)
- Elevation: 5 m (16 ft)

Population (2011)
  - Total: 54,591
  - Density: 5,249/km^{2} (13,600/sq mi)

Languages
  - Official: Bengali, Hindi, English
- Time zone: UTC+5:30 (IST)
- Postal codes: 721222, 721212,
- ISO 3166 code: IN-WB
- Vehicle registration: WB50
- Lok Sabha constituency: Ghatal
- Vidhan Sabha constituency: Ghatal
- Website: Ghatal Municipality

Ghatal is a town and a municipality in Paschim Medinipur district, West Bengal, India. Earlier it was part of Hooghly District in 1872 it was merged with Medinipur district. It is the headquarters of the Ghatal subdivision.

== History ==
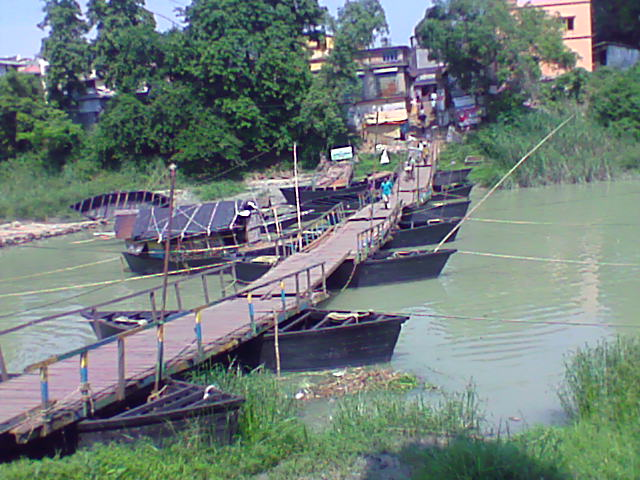
A Bridge on the Boat in Ghatal town

In ancient times, when Tamralipta was an active port, Ghatal had its own ‘Bandar’ (port), 3 km east of Ghatal PS, used for anchoring boats and ships with goods. Now, the place is the confluence of the Dwarakeswar, Shilabati, Damodar and Jhumi. Ghatal was famous for manufacturing of cotton goods, tussar silk, bell metal utensils etc., and the Dutch had a factory here. The activities continued until the early British period.

In the early British period, Ghatal PS and Chandrakona PS were a part of Jahanabad (later Arambagh) in Hooghly district and were transferred in 1872 to Midnapore district. These became a part of the newly formed Ghatal subdivision in 1876. Daspur PS became a part of it in 1877. Ghatal municipality was formed in 1869.

== Geography ==
Cities and towns in Ghatal subdivision of Paschim Medinipur district
M: municipal city/ town, R: rural/ urban centre, H: historical/ religious centre
Owing to space constraints in the small map, the actual locations in a larger map may vary slightly

=== Location ===
Ghatal is located at 22.67°N 87.72°E. It has an average elevation of 5 metres (16 feet).

Ghatal is a flood-prone area and in many years is flooded by the Shilabati River. The Shilabati divides the city into two parts. Near Bandar, the Shilabati and the Darkeswar river join the Rupnarayan river. The Ghatal Police station lies on the west bank of the river. There is one peculiar floating bridge on the river made by joining boats tied with rope from both sides in the banks, called "Bhasa Pool" (floating bridge). Also, one cement bridge is constructed on the main pitch road or State Highway 4 passing through Chandrakona Town, Ghatal, Daspur, and Mechogram.

=== Area overview ===
Ishwar Chandra Vidyasagar, scholar, social reformer and a key figure of the Bengal Renaissance, was born at Birsingha on 26 September 1820.

Ghatal subdivision, shown in the map alongside, has alluvial soils. Around 85% of the total cultivated area is cropped more than once. It has a density of population of 1,099 per km^{2}, but being a small subdivision only a little over a fifth of the people in the district reside in this subdivision. 14.33% of the population lives in urban areas and 86.67% lives in the rural areas.

Note: The map alongside presents some of the notable locations in the subdivision. All places marked in the map are linked in the larger full screen map.

== Demographics ==
As per 2011 Census of India, Ghatal had a total population of 54,591 of which 27,882 (51%) were males and 26,709 (49%) were females. Population in the age range 0–6 years was 5,399. The total number of literate persons in Ghatal was 44,016 (89.48% of the population over 6 years).

As of 2001 India census, Ghatal had a population of 51,586. Males constitute 52% of the population and females 48%. Ghatal has an average literacy rate of 76%, higher than the national average of 59.5%: male literacy is 83%, and female literacy is 69%. In Ghatal, 11% of the population is under 6 years of age.

== Civic administration ==
=== CD block HQ ===
The headquarters of Ghatal CD block is located at Ghatal.

=== Police station ===
Ghatal police station has jurisdiction over Ghatal and Kharar municipalities and Ghatal CD block.

== Transportation ==
Ghatal is well connected by roads and highways with nearby cities like Kolkata, Howrah, Midnapore, Kanthi, Digha, Burdwan, Bankura. For local transportation buses (both state and private), minibusses, tempos and cycle-rickshaws are available. Panskura Railway Station is the nearest railway station. SH 4 passes through Ghatal.

== Education ==
Ghatal Rabindra Satabarsiki Mahavidyalaya was established in 1961. Affiliated with the Vidyasagar University, it offers honors courses in Bengali, Sanskrit, English, Political Science, Philosophy, History, Physics, Chemistry, Mathematics, Computer Science, Zoology, Botany, Geography, Economics, and Accountancy; post graduate courses in Bengali, English, Sanskrit, History, Philosophy, and Mathematics, and general courses in arts, science, and commerce.

Ghatal Government Polytechnic, established in 2016, offers diploma courses in civil, mechanical, and electrical engineering.

Ghatal Government ITI, an Industrial Training Institute established in 2016, offers ITI courses in Fitter, Electrician, Welder, Surveyor, Dress Making, and Electronic Mechanic. This ITI college is located at Birsingha (Birth place of Ishwar Chandra Vidyasagar).

Ghatal Vidyasagar High School is a Bengali-medium coeducational institution established in 1886. The school has facilities for teaching from class V to class XII. It has a library with 11,000 books, 26 computers and a playground. The school was founded by Iswar Chandra Vidyasagar.

Ghatal Basanta Kumari Girls High School is a Bengali-medium girls only institution established in 1957. The school has facilities for teaching from class V to class XII. It has a library with 2,000 books, 4 computers and a playground.

Ghatal Yogoda Satsanga Sri Yukteswar Vidyapith is a Bengali-medium coeducational institution established in 1958. The school has facilities for teaching from class V to class XII. It has a library with 3,200 books.

== Culture ==
The common people of this area maintained a culture something different from other parts of the district in conducting and observing their way of work in rituals and customs. They cherish their customs. For example, the people celebrating the worship of Maa Sitala Buri and other Maa Sitalas in an around Ghatal Town used to carry hundreds of dhaks in procession and arrange open operas acting on the stage dragged and pushed by the men on pitch road running through the town.

Among many festivals in Ghatal Sishu Mela (around the month of February) is most popular. Many people of Ghatal town and its neighbouring blocks take part in the Sishu Mela. Vidyasagar Mela is also popular, which takes place in Birsingha (the birthplace of Iswarchandra Vidyasagar). The regular Bengali festivals like Durga Puja, Lakshmi Puja, Saraswati Puja and Kali Puja are well attended and observed with glorious themed pandals. Other common pujas in the worship of Sitala, Jagaddhatri, Holi, Janmastami, Bheema Puja, Jhulan also takes place.

Science exhibitions, seminars on science and literature, awareness programmes on health and agriculture are usually held in Ghatal Town hall. Besides that musical, dance and magic shows are also held in Ghatal Town hall.

The Visalaxmi temple at Barada and Khipteswari temple at Ghatal are the main tourist attractions. There is also the Kushpata Satsanga Ashram. The largest Thakur Anukul Chandra temple of West Bengal is situated on the bank of Shilabati River which is 1.5 km (1 mi) away from Ghatal Vidyasagar Setu. Here one can see several temples of Anukul Thakur. There is a large prayer room for the common people. Every day a huge number of people go to the temple to worship GOD, spend some great time with their families, and enjoy the silence with beautiful greenery on the banks of the river Shilabati. There are many ashramas like Anukul Thakurer Satsanga ashram, Nigamanand er ashram, Ramkrishna Mission, and Swami Debananda ashram.

There is an Independent Short Film Production House Named Niltara Films. The Production house was established in 2018. It is situated on the riverside of Silaboti near the electric office. Niltara Films has made different kinds of Short films and got many awards. Their most remarkable Project is Joker (Short Film -2019), Directed by Soumen Paul, The Stranger (short film – 2020). And their upcoming short film is Laxmi The Curse. It will be released in 2021. Niltara Films is the first Film making production House at Ghatal.

=== Temples ===
David J. McCutchion mentions:

- The Vrindaban Chandra temple as a West Bengal nava-ratna with ridged rekha turrets, built in 1794, with rich terracotta façade, it measures 17’ 6” square.
- The Ragunatha temple at Nimtala as a nava-ratna with smooth rekha turrets, built in 1801 with rich terracotta facade; measuring 20’ 11” x 19’ 8”.
- The Raghunatha temple as a small flat-roofed or chandni type, built in 1797, it has terracotta archway panels etc.
- The Sridhara temple at Katan as a double storied flat roofed temple, the upper storey was added in 1885, with rich terracotta, measuring hh14’ 10” x 16’.
- The Simhavahini temple as char-chala temple with a char-chala porch, built in 1490, with slight terracotta, measuring 13’ square + 8’ 9” square.

== Ghatal picture gallery ==
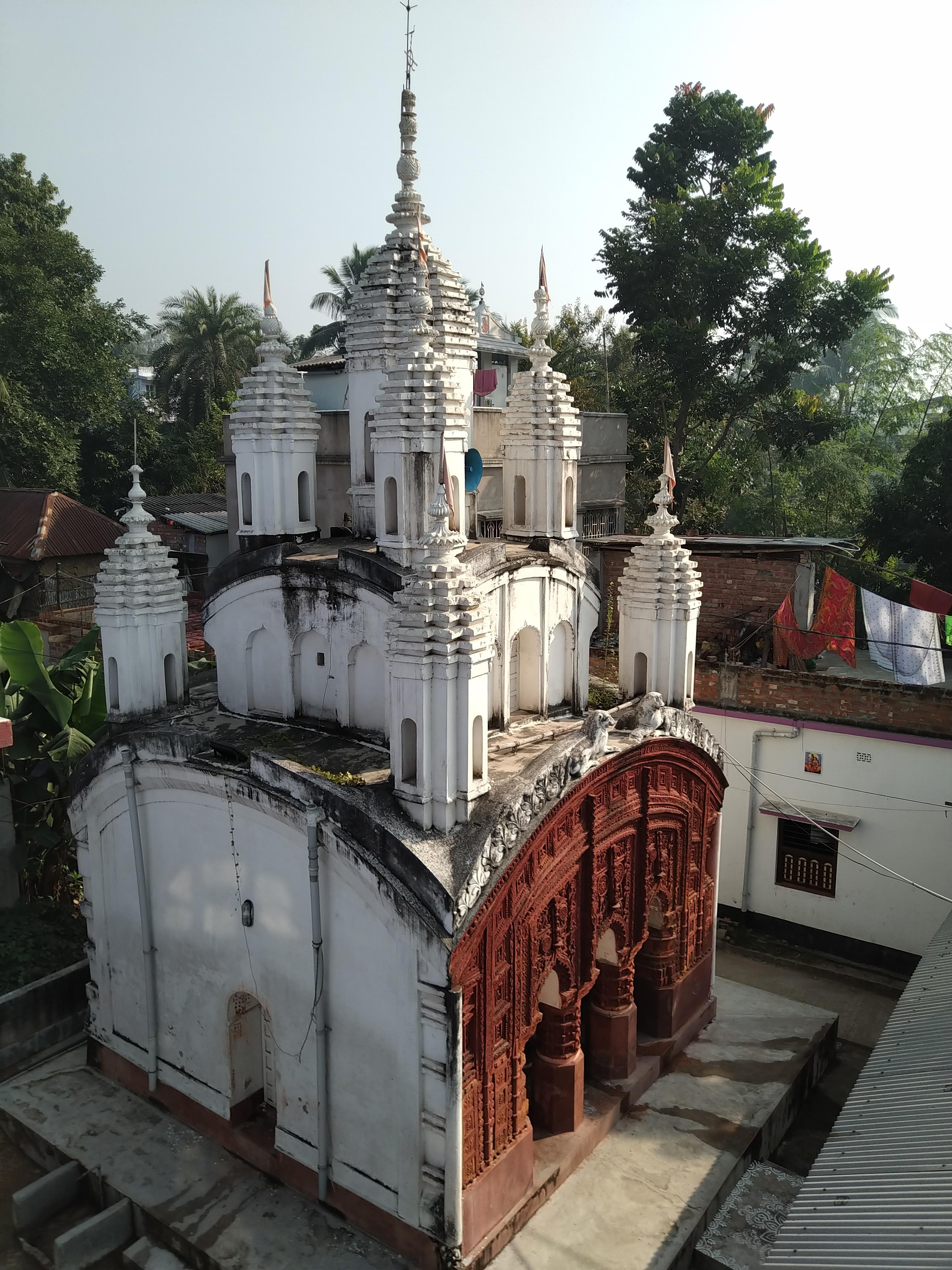
Vrindabana Chandra temple at Konnagar

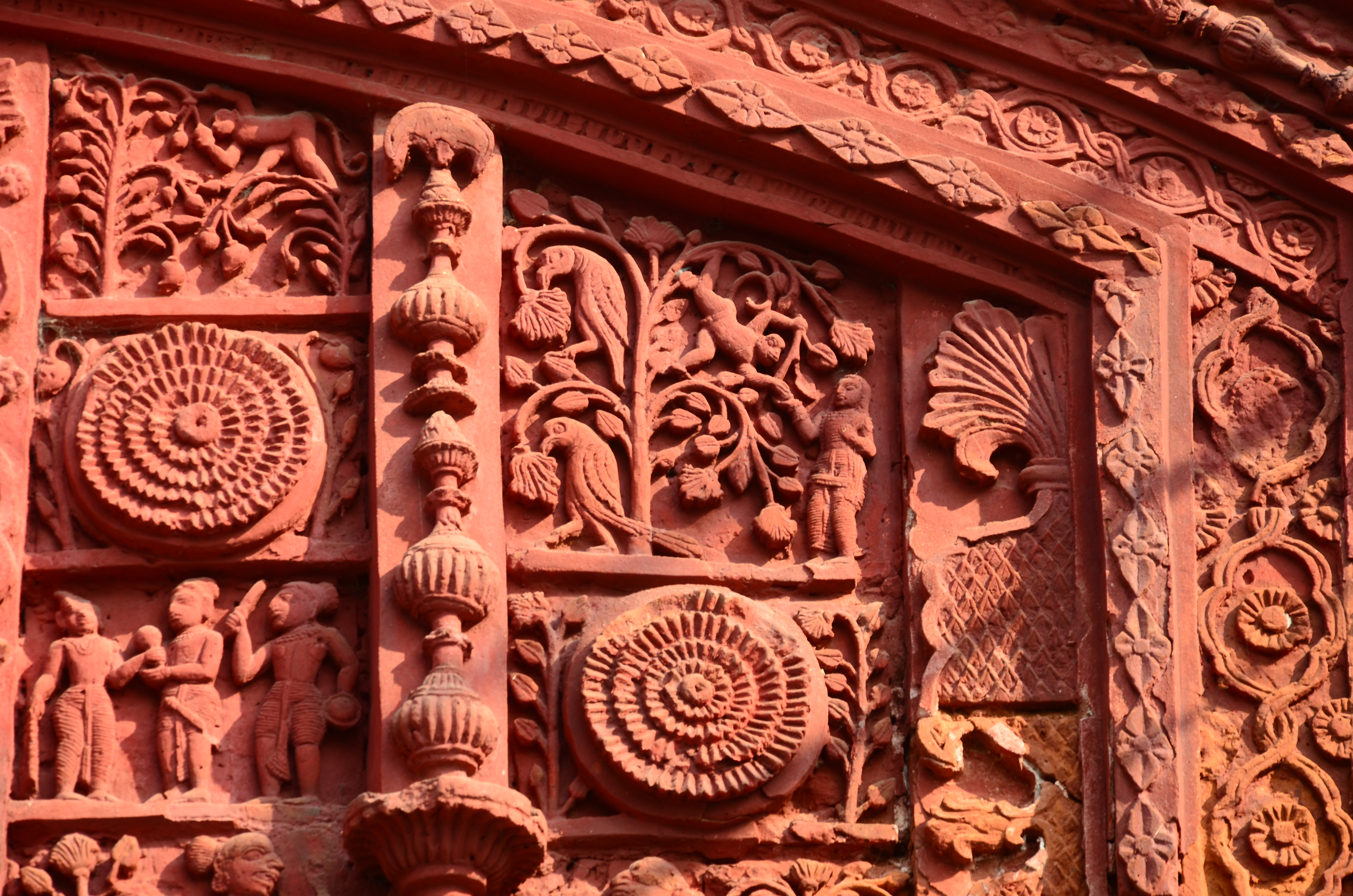
Terracotta relief at Vrindabana Chandra temple

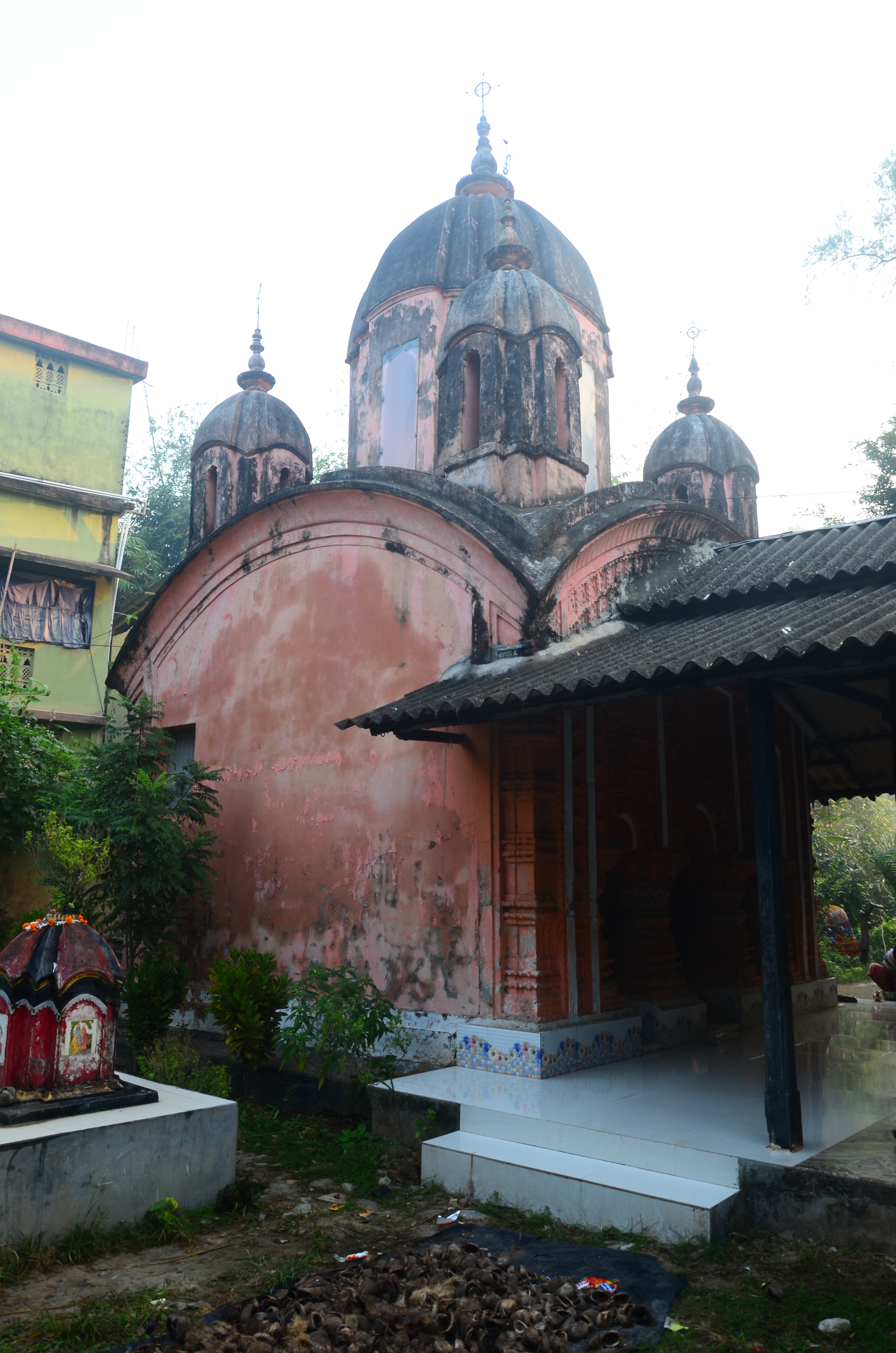
Shridharjiu temple of Jana family at Chauli

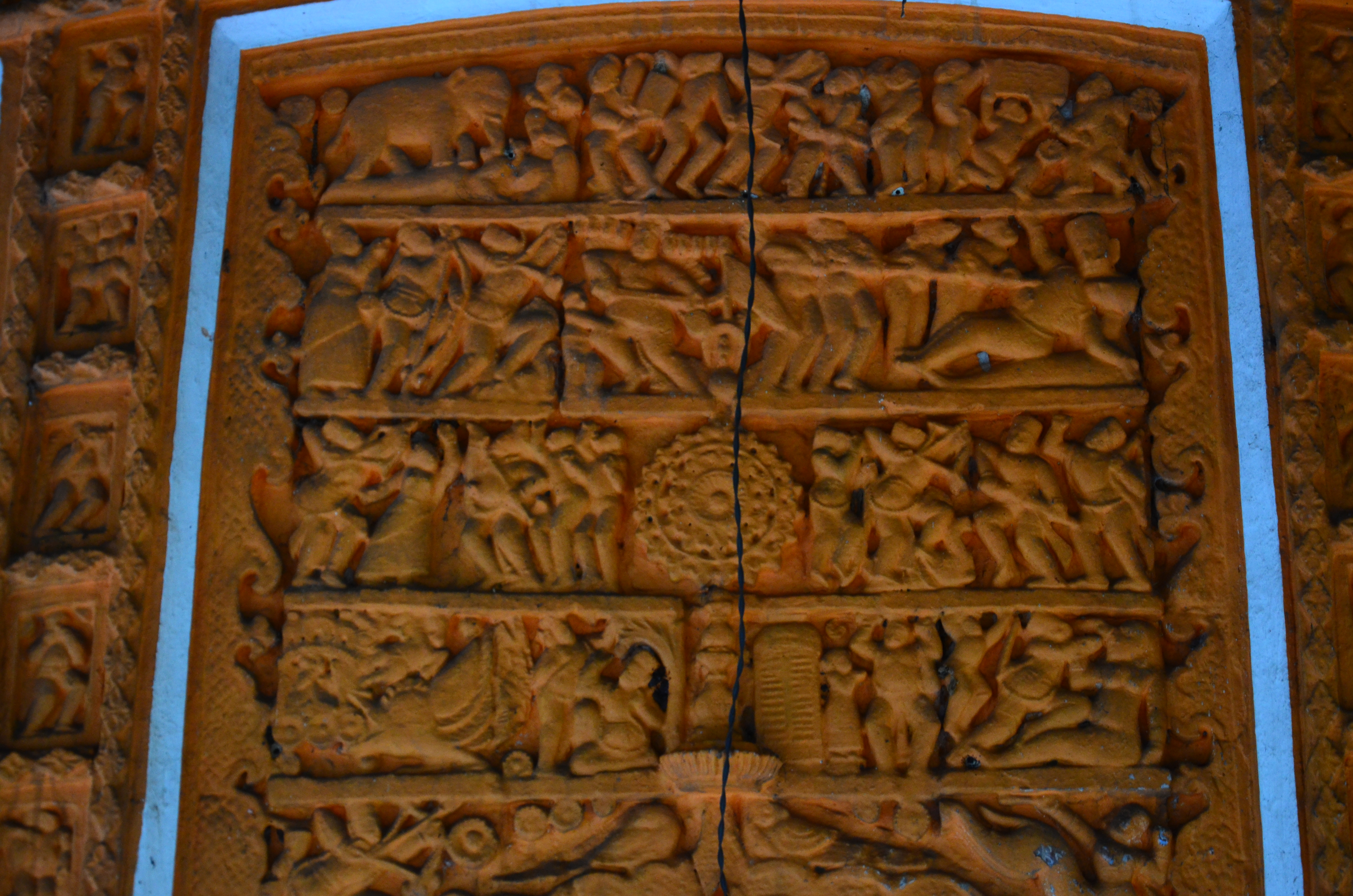
Terracotta panel in Sridharjiu temple

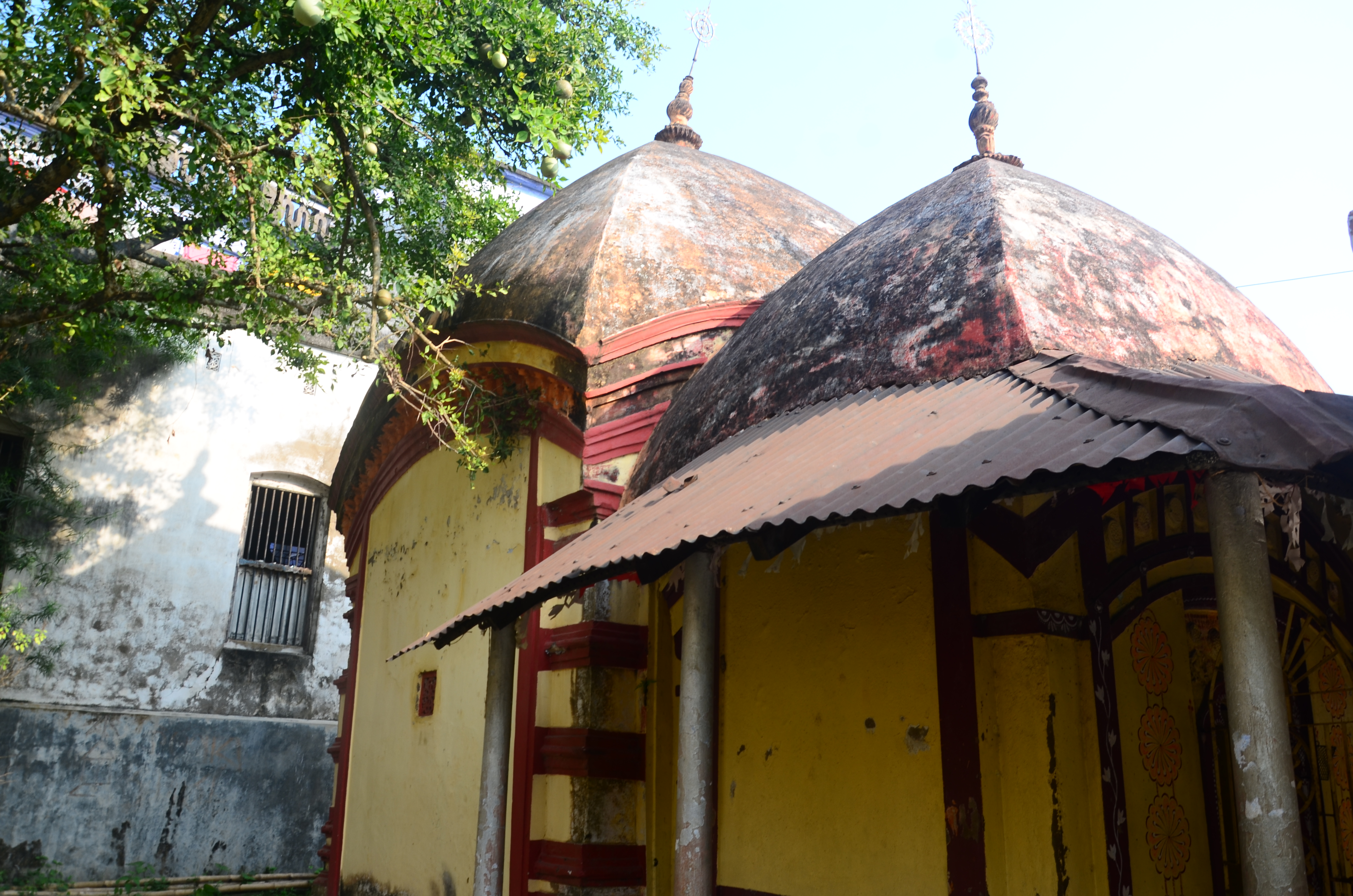
Simhavahini temple at Konnagar

== Tourist spots ==
- Bhasapool (Polton Bridge) - Heritage of India
- Kushpata Satsanga Ashram of Anukul Thakur
- Visalaxmi Temple at Barada
- Birsingha - birthplace of Ishwar Chandra Vidyasagar
- Eco park- picnic destination
- Birsingha Bhagabati Vidyalaya (H.S) - established by Pandit Ishwar Vidyasagar

== Notable people ==
- Akinchan Chakrabarty, 18th-century Bengali poet
- Deepak Adhikari (Dev) Actor
- Ishwar Chandra Vidyasagar

== Healthcare ==
Ghatal Subdivisional Hospital functions with 550 beds.

=== Medical facilities ===
Medical facilities in the Ghatal subdivision are as follows:

Hospitals: (Name, location, beds)

- Ghatal Subdivisional Hospital, Ghatal (M), 550 beds

Rural hospitals: (Name, CD block, location, beds)

- Khirpai Rural Hospital, Chandrakona I CD block, Khirpai, 30 beds
- Chandrakona Rural Hospital, Chandrakona II CD block, Chandrakona, 60 beds
- Daspur Rural Hospital, Daspur I CD block, Daspur, 30 beds
- Sonakhali Rural Hospital, Daspur II CD block, Sonakhali, 30 beds

Block primary health centres: (Name, CD block, location, beds)

- Viidyasagar Block Primary Health Centre, Ghatal CD block, Birsingha, 10 beds

Primary health centres : (CD block-wise)(CD block, PHC location, beds)

- Chandrakona I CD block: Ramjibanpur (10), Ramkrishnapur (PO Tatarpara) (10), Mangrul (PO Goaldanga Mangrul) (10), Dingal (PO Dingal-Kumargeria) (10), Jara (2)
- Chandrrakona II CD block: Basanchora (PO Chhatraganj) (10), Bhagabantapur (4),
- Ghatal CD block: Khasbarh (6), Natuk (10),
- Daspur I: Makrampur (PO Choto Makrampur) (4), Narajole (10), Sekenday (2)
- Daspur II: Khukurda (10), Nischintapur (6), Chaipat (6)

== Bibliography ==
- Riello, Giorgio; Roy, Tirthankar (2009). How India Clothed the World: The World of South Asian Textiles, 1500-1850. p. 240. ISBN 9789004176539.
- Chatterjee, Gouripada (1987). History of Bagree-Rajya (Garhbeta): With Special Reference to Its Anti-British Role, from Late 18th Century Till the Present Times. p. 141. ISBN 9788170990147.
- Chatterjee, Gouripada (1986). Midnapore, the Forerunner of India's Freedom Struggle. p. 100.
- Das, Binod Sankar (1984). Changing Profile of the Frontier Bengal, 1751-1833. p. 149.
- Mitra, Asok; Census Commissioner, India (1952). District Handbooks: Malda. p. i.
