= Jahalda =

- village
- Nickname: Jahalda
- Location in West Bengal, India Jahalda (India)
- Coordinates: 21.940511°N 87.490378°E
- Country: India
- State: West Bengal

Languages
  - Official: Bengali, English
- Time zone: UTC+5:30 (IST)
- PIN: 721443

Jahalda is a village in Paschim Medinipur, West Bengal, India.

Jahalda is the main marketplace for villagers of Bamnasai, Palashi, Uttar Asda, Apartiya, Amarda, Nahanjra, Bimbal Titiya, Baharda, Sarrang, Bansichak, Tentulia, Kasmuli, Poralda, Haripur, Brahman Khalisa, etc. A big super market is present here. Its latitude is 21.940511 N and longitude is 87.490378 E. ,

== Economy ==
- Jahalda Bangiya Gramin Vikash Bank (BGVB)
- Jahalda P.O
- Jahalda rice-mill
- Jahalda ice cream factory
- Jahalda State Bank of India
- JAHALDA SUPER MARKET

== Culture ==
- JAHALDA COMMUNITY HALL
- JAHALDA SHITALA MAYER MANDIR

== Education ==
In this area, the most popular government school is Jahalda High School. Besides that two public schools are available 1) Nabapallab 2) Maa Sharada Sishu Siksha Niketan.
