= Rajkushma =

Village in West Bengal, India

Rajkushma is a village in the Paschim Medinipur District in West Bengal, India. It lies on the Silda-Parihati road. Its neighbouring villages are Ashakanthi, Joypur, Posdaand, and Kishoripur. The village has a primary school by the name of Ashakanthi Primary School, though it is not located in the Ashakanthi mouza. The population comprises members of the Karmakar, Gandhabanik, Teli, Bhuina and Karia-Lodha-Sobar castes.
