= Pachakhali =

- village
- Location in West Bengal Pachakhali (India)
- Coordinates: 22°04′26″N 87°03′07″E
- Country: India
- State: West Bengal
- District: Paschim Medinipur
- Time zone: UTC+5:30 (IST)
- PIN: 721135

Pachakhali is a village in the Ghritagram-I No. Gram Panchayat Paschim Medinipur district of West Bengal, India. It is located about 18 kilometres (11 mi) west south-west of Keshiary, across the Subarnarekha River. The population is more than 1,000. The village has a primary school .
