= Narma, Paschim Medinipur =

Narma
- village
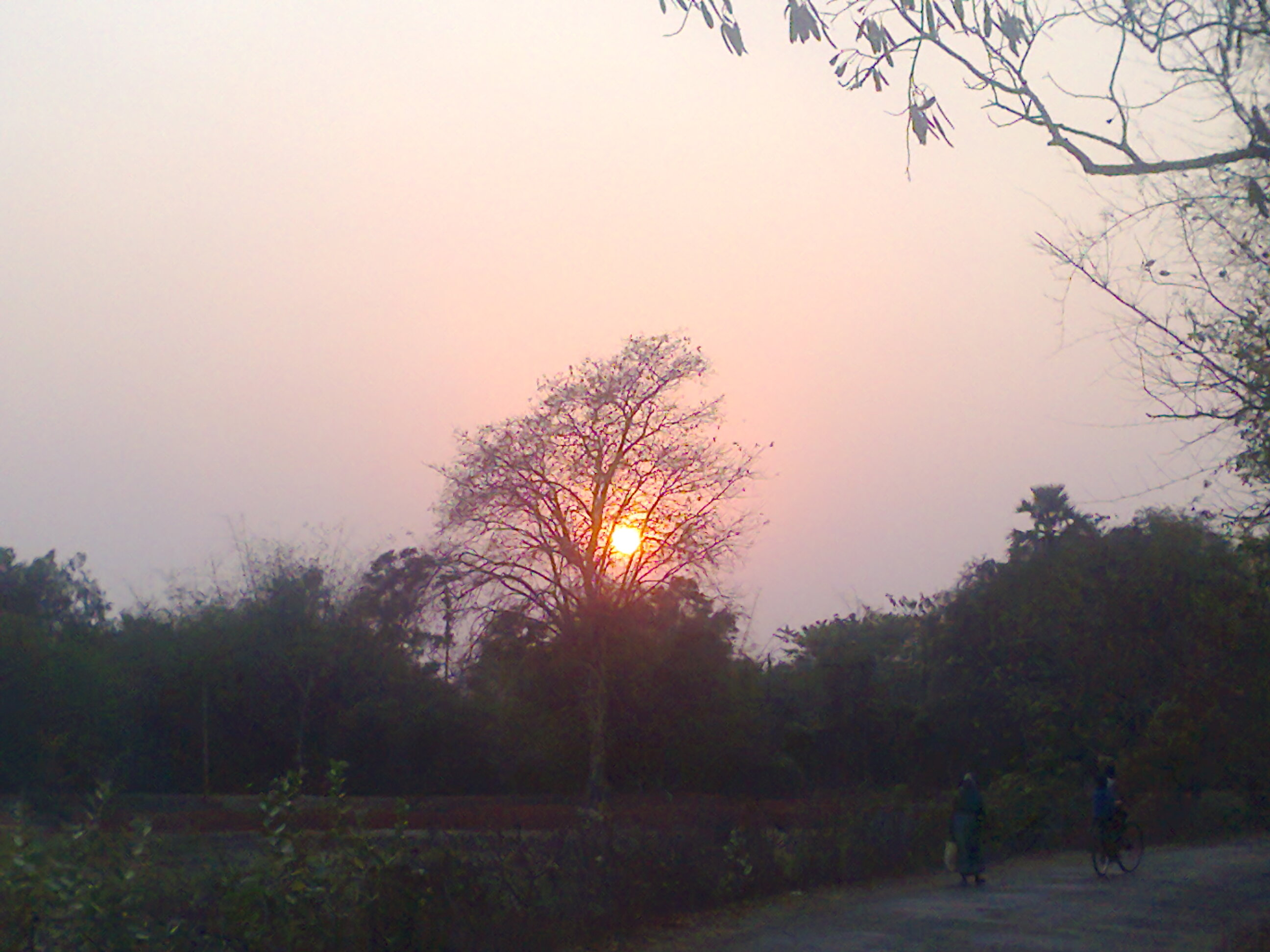
- Sunset view at Narma

- Location in West Bengal, India Narma (India)
- Coordinates: 22°13′23″N 87°29′38″E
- Country: India
- State: West Bengal
- District: Paschim Medinipur

Languages
  - Official: Bengali, English
- Time zone: UTC+5:30 (IST)

Narma (previously known as Larma) is a village in the Paschim Medinipur district in West Bengal, India. The village is approximately 45 km from Kharagpur town, about halfway (22 km) along the road connecting Makhrampur and Temathani. This road passes through the village, dividing it into almost two equal parts. The nearest railway station is Balichak, about 30 km away.

It is the birthplace of Srila Bhakti Kumud Santa Maharaja, a monk who founded the Acharya of Sri Gauranga Math (Kesiary), Sri Chaitanya Ashram (Kharagpur, Puri, Calcutta) and Sri Gaur Saraswat Santa Gaudiya Math (Chhekati and Baradiya).
