= Paschim Medinipur district =

District in West Bengal, India

Paschim Medinipur district West Medinipur district
- District of West Bengal
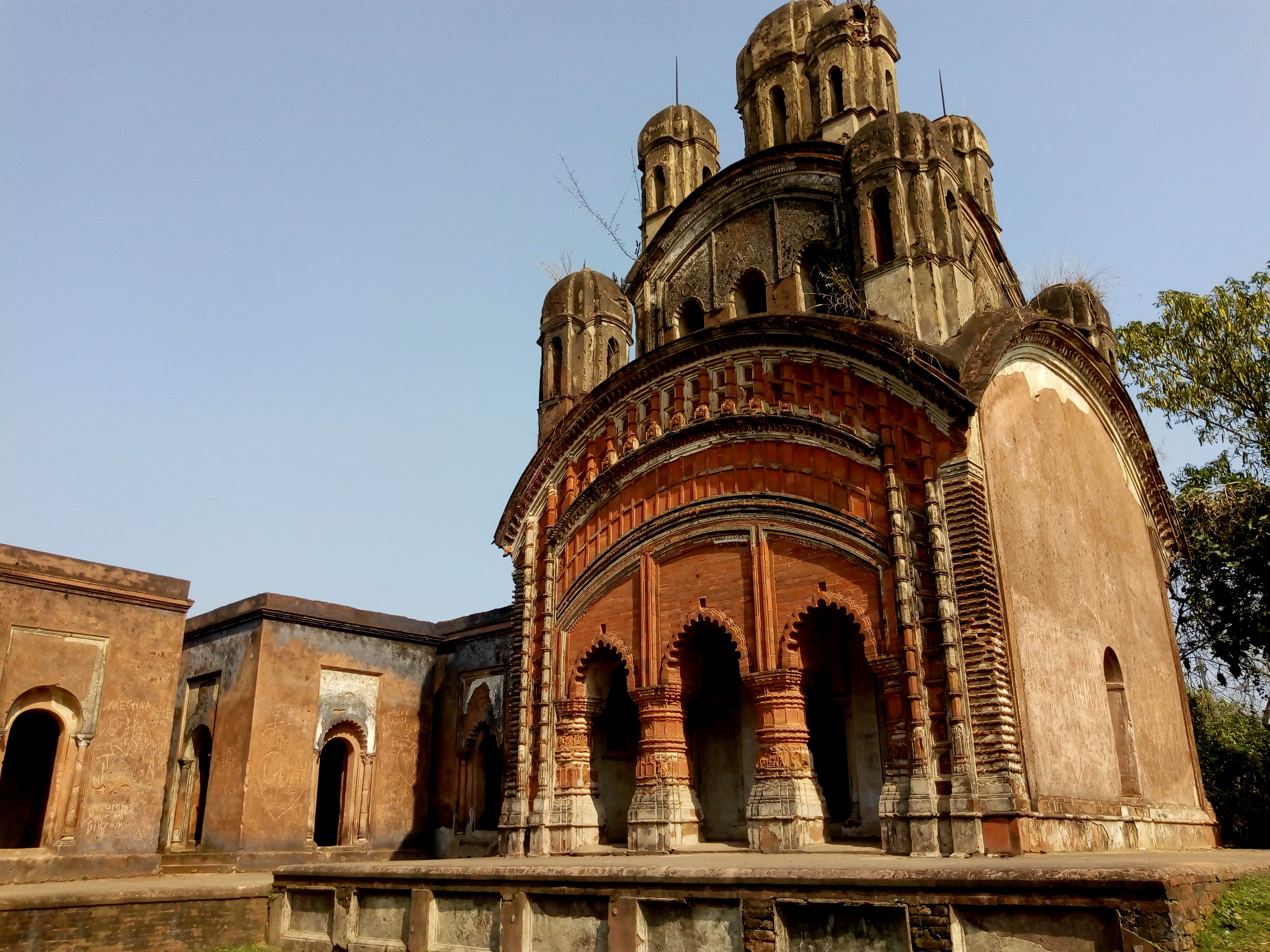
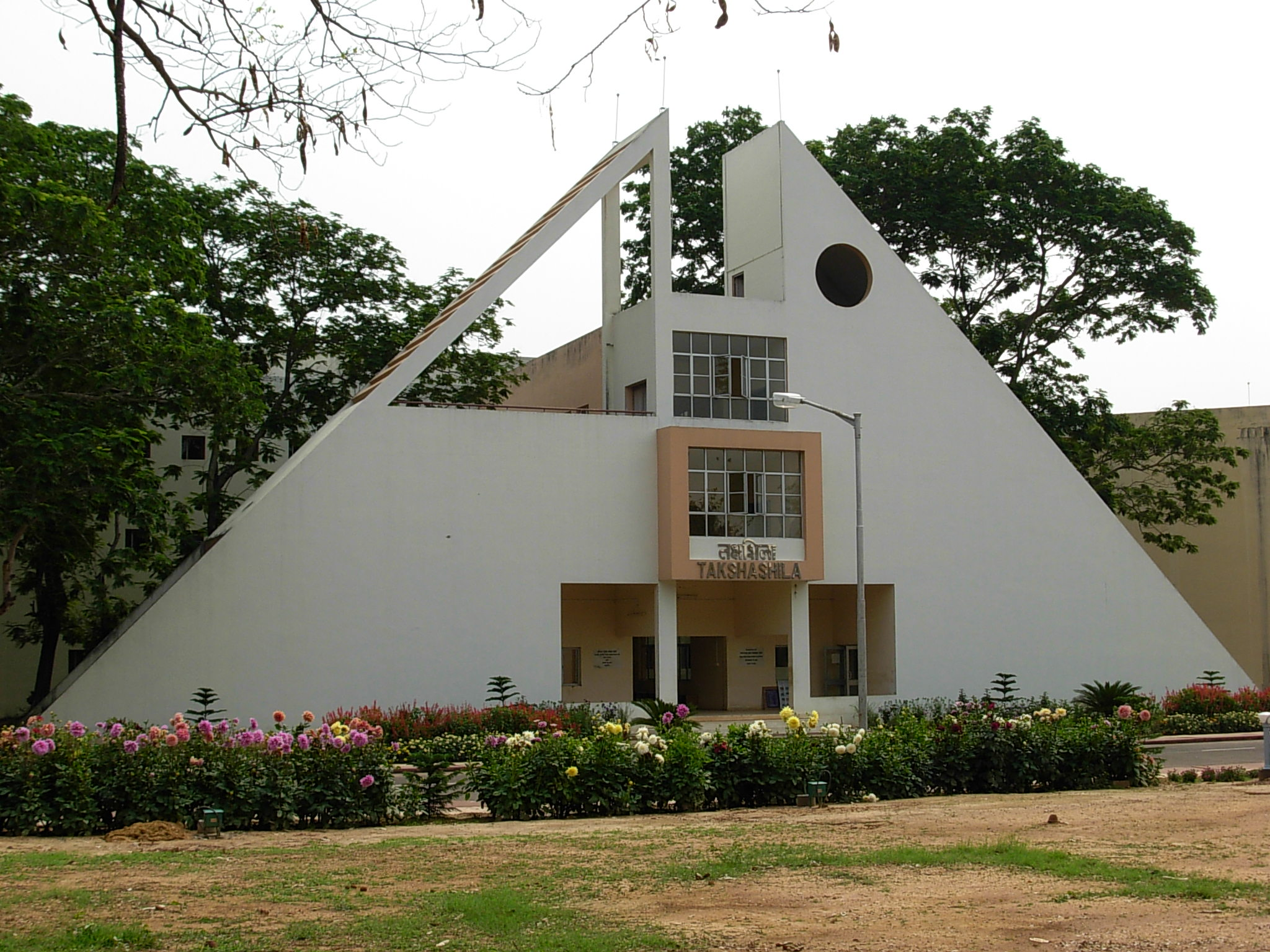
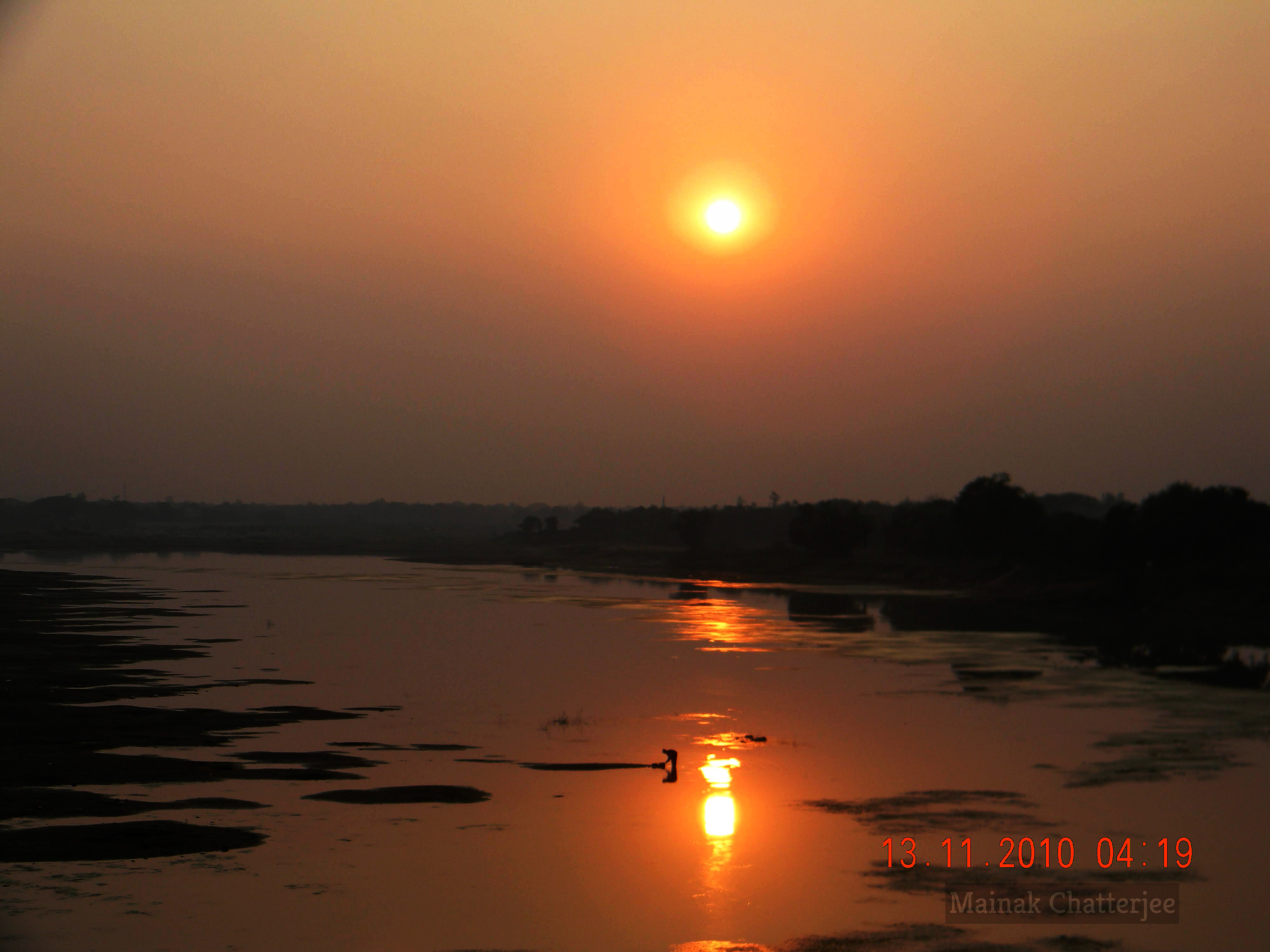
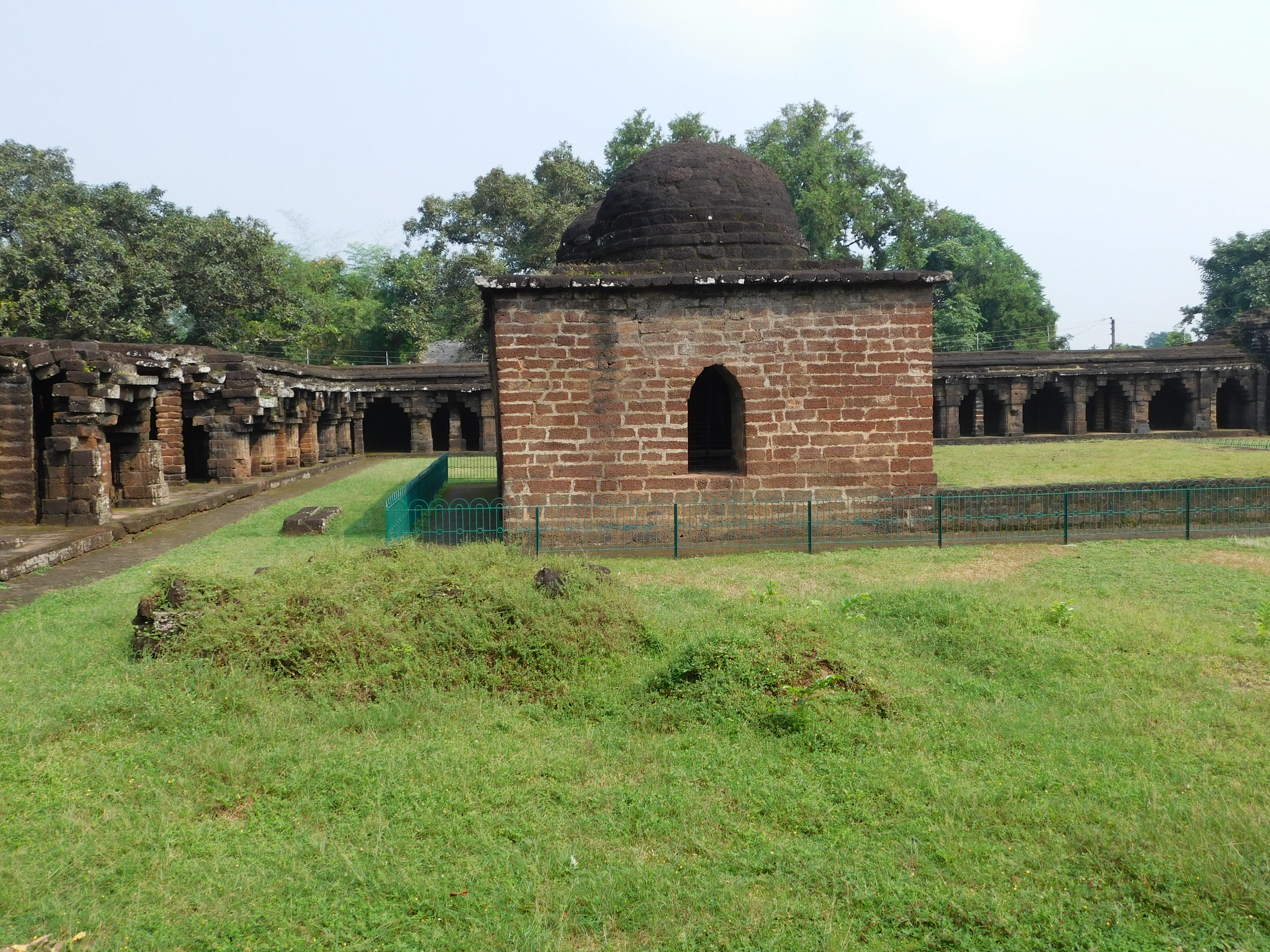
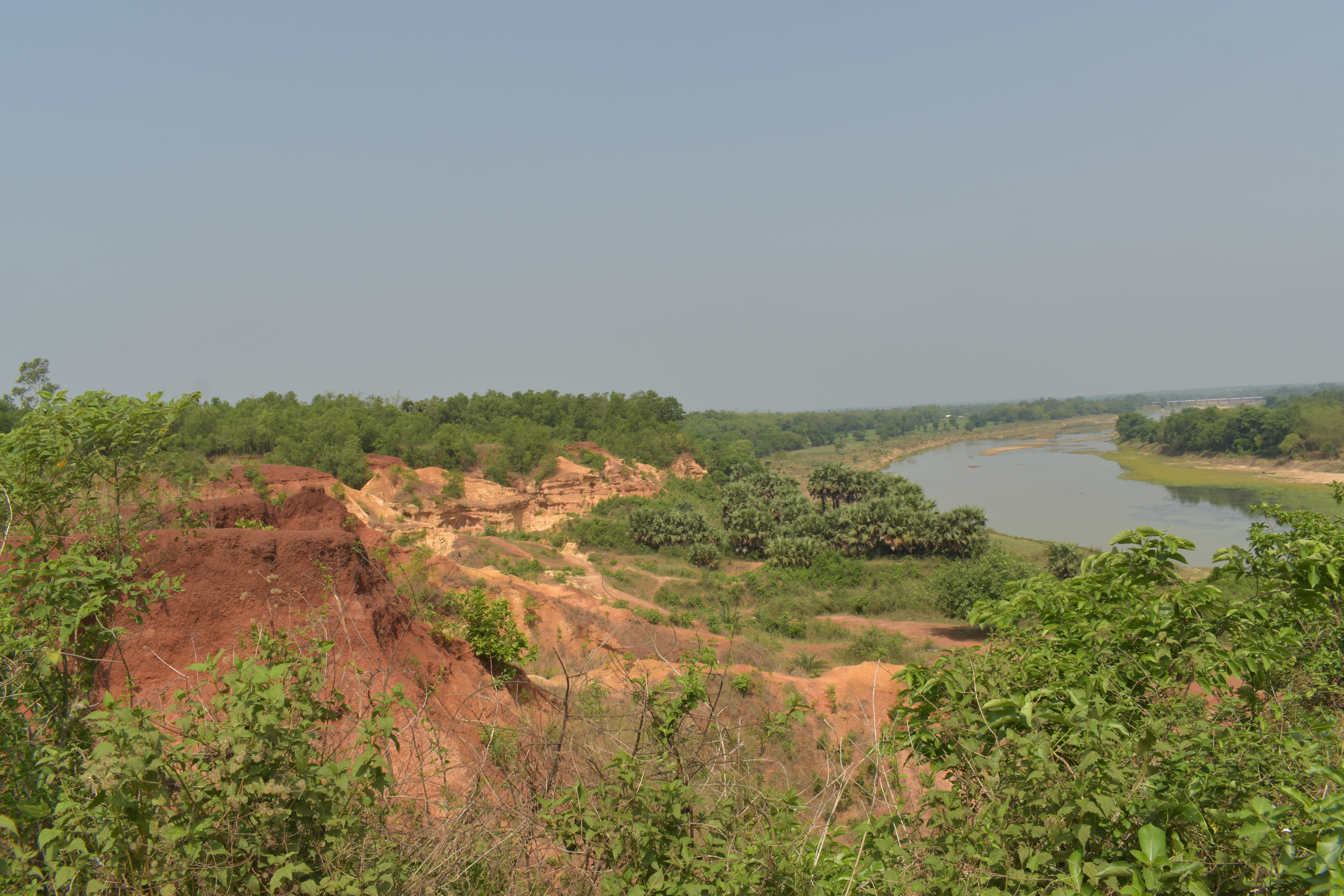
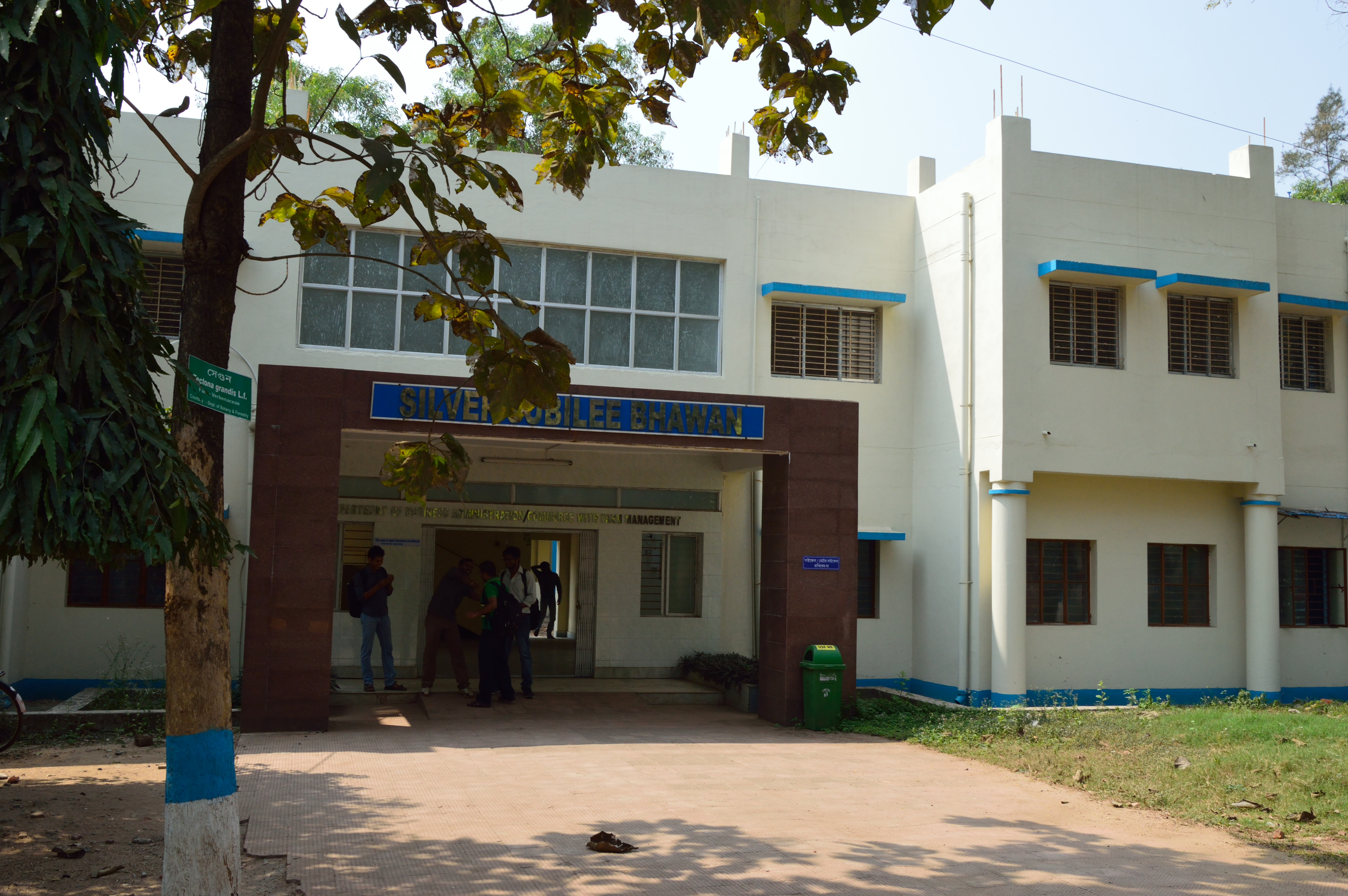
- Clockwise from top-left: Nabaratna Temple in Pathra, Takshashila building at IIT Kharagpur, Kurumbera Fort, Vidyasagar University in Midnapore, Gongoni Danga, Kangsabati River
- Interactive Map Outlining Paschim Medinipur District
- Location of Paschim Medinipur district in West Bengal
- Coordinates: 22.424°N 87.319°E
- Country: India
- State: West Bengal
- Division: Midnapore
- Headquarters: Midnapore

Government
  - Subdivisions: Medinipur Sadar, Kharagpur, Ghatal
  - CD Blocks: Midnapore Sadar, Garhbeta I, Garhbeta II, Garhbeta III, Keshpur, Salboni, Dantan I, Dantan II, Pingla, Kharagpur I, Kharagpur II, Sabang, Mohanpur, Narayangarh, Keshiari, Debra, Chandrakona I, Chandrakona II, Daspur I, Daspur II, Ghatal
  - Lok Sabha constituencies: Medinipur, Ghatal, Jhargram, Arambagh
  - Vidhan Sabha constituencies: Dantan, Keshiary, Kharagpur Sadar, Narayangarh, Sabang, Pingla, Kharagpur, Debra, Daspur, Ghatal, Chandrakona, Garbeta, Salboni, Keshpur, Medinipur

Area
  - Total: 6,308 km^{2} (2,436 sq mi)

Population (2011)
  - Total: 4,776,909
  - Density: 757.3/km^{2} (1,961/sq mi)
  - Urban: 11.9 per cent

Demographics
  - Literacy: 79.04 per cent
  - Sex ratio: 960 ♂/♀

Languages
  - Official: Bengali
  - Additional official: English
- Time zone: UTC+05:30 (IST)
- Website: www.paschimmedinipur.gov.in

Paschim Medinipur (English: West Medinipur, alternative spelling Midnapore) district is one of the districts of the state of West Bengal, India. It was formed on 1 January 2002 after the partition of Midnapore into Paschim Medinipur and Purba Medinipur. On 4 April 2017, the Jhargram subdivision was upgraded to a district. GDP of West Midnapore district is 12 billion USD.

== Geography ==
Paschim Medinipur, located in the south-western part of West Bengal, was created with the partition of the erstwhile Midnapore district, then the largest district of India, on 1 January 2002. It ranks second in terms of geographical area (9,295.28 km^{2}) amongst the districts of the state, next to South 24-Parganas (9,960 km^{2}). It ranks third in terms of rural population (4.58 million) following South 24-Parganas (5.82 million) and Murshidabad (5.13 million). It ranked fourth in terms of percentage of tribal population (14.87) following Jalpaiguri (18.87), Purulia (18.27) and Dakshin Dinajpur (16.12) in 2011.

Broadly speaking, there are two natural divisions of the district. NH 14 and NH 16 (old numbering NH 60) from Bankura to Balasore, cuts across the district and roughly is the dividing line between the two natural divisions. To the east of this road, the soil is fertile alluvial and the area is flat. To the west, the Chota Nagpur Plateau gradually slopes down, creating an undulating area with infertile laterite rocks and soil. The landscape changes from dense dry deciduous forests in the west to marshy wetlands in the east.

The alluvial portion may be further subdivided into two divisions. First, it is a strip of purely deltaic country nearer to the Hooghly and the Rupnarayan, intersected by numerous rivers and watercourses subject to tidal influences. Second, it is the rest of the eastern half of the district. It is a monotonous rice plain with numerous waterways and tidal creeks intersecting it. The tidal creeks are lined with embankments to prevent flooding of the fields. Much of the area is water-logged.

=== Floods and drought ===
Paschim Medinipur district is subject to both floods and drought. Ghatal and parts of Kharagpur subdivision covering an area of 142,647 hectares (1,426.47 km^{2}) are flood prone. Water logging during the rainy season affects Ghatal and the southern parts of Kharagpur subdivision and results in loss of crops in such areas as Sabang, Pingla and Narayangarh CD Blocks. 335,248 hectares (3,352.48 km^{2}) Medinipur Sadar subdivision is drought prone. Although the district is away from the sea, cyclones hit it frequently in October–November.

=== Major cities and towns ===
Midnapore is the district headquarters. Kharagpur is the largest city in the district. Other important towns and cities in the district include: Salboni, Ghatal, Belda, Chandrakona, Ramjibanpur, Garbeta, Balichak, Dantan, Mohanpur, Keshiari, Keshpur, Narayangarh, Sabang, Daspur, Goaltore and Debra.

=== Villages ===
Paschim Medinipur district is home to the most villages of any district in India. The 2011 census lists Paschim Medinipur as having 8,694 villages, of which 7,600 are populated, and 1,094 uninhabited. The district with the next highest number of villages, Mayurbhanj, in the state of Odisha, has 3,950 villages, 3,751 of which are inhabited.

- Jahalda
- Narma
- Pachakhali
- Rajkushma

== Economy and politics ==
In 2006 the Ministry of Panchayati Raj named Paschim Medinipur one of the country's 250 most backward districts (out of a total of 640). It is one of the eleven districts in West Bengal currently receiving funds from the Backward Regions Grant Fund Programme (BRGF).

106 districts spanning 10 states across India, described as being part of Left Wing Extremism activities, constitute the Red corridor. In West Bengal the districts of Paschim Medinipur, Bankura, Purulia and Birbhum are part of the Red corridor. However, as of July 2016, there has been no reported incidents of Maoist related activities from these districts for the previous 4 years. In the period 2009–2011 LWE violence resulted in more than 500 deaths and a similar number missing in Paschim Medinipur district.

== Divisions ==
Paschim Medinipur district is divided into the following administrative subdivisions:

Subdivision	Headquarters	Area km^{2}	Population (2011)	Rural population % (2011)	Urban population % (2011)
Medinipur Sadar	Midnapore	2,441.50	1,435,321	86.05	13.95
Kharagpur	Kharagpur	2,913.17	2,293,909	85.67	14.33
Ghatal	Ghatal	953.09	1,047,679	87.94	12.06

=== Administrative subdivisions ===
The district comprises three subdivisions: Kharagpur, Medinipur Sadar and Ghatal. Kharagpur subdivision consists of Kharagpur municipality and ten community development blocks: Dantan–I, Dantan–II, Pingla, Kharagpur–I, Kharagpur–II, Sabang, Mohanpur, Narayangarh, Keshiari and Debra. Medinipur Sadar subdivision consists of Midnapore municipality and six community development blocks: Medinipur Sadar, Garhbeta–I, Garhbeta–II, Garhbeta–III, Keshpur and Shalboni. Ghatal subdivision consists of five municipalities (Ramjibanpur, Chandrakona, Khirpai, Kharar and Ghatal) and five community development blocks: Chandrakona–I, Chandrakona–II, Daspur–I, Daspur–II and Ghatal.

Midnapore is the district headquarters. There are 28 police stations, 21 development blocks, 7 municipalities and 290 gram panchayats in this district.

Other than municipality area, each subdivision contains community development blocks which in turn are divided into rural areas and census towns. In total there are 11 urban units: 7 municipalities and 4 census towns.

==== Kharagpur subdivision ====
- One municipality: Kharagpur.
- Dantan I community development block consists of rural areas with 9 gram panchayats and one census town: Chaulia
- Dantan II community development block consists of rural areas only with 7 gram panchayats.
- Pingla community development block consists of rural areas only with 10 gram panchayats.
- Kharagpur I community development block consists of rural areas with 7 gram panchayats and two census towns: Kharagpur Railway Settlement and Kalaikunda.
- Kharagpur II community development block consists of rural areas only with 9 gram panchayats.
- Sabang community development block consists of rural areas only with 13 gram panchayats.
- Mohanpur community development block consists of rural areas only with 5 gram panchayats.
- Narayangarh community development block consists of rural areas with 16 gram panchayats and one census town: Deuli.
- Keshiari community development block consists of only rural areas with 9 gram panchayats.
- Debra community development block consists of rural areas with 14 gram panchayats and one census town: Balichak.

==== Medinipur Sadar subdivision ====
- One municipality: Midnapore.
- Midnapore Sadar community development block consists of rural areas only with 9 gram panchayats.
- Garhbeta I community development block consists of rural areas with 12 gram panchayats and two census towns: Garbeta and Amlagora
- Garhbeta II community development block consists of rural areas only with 10 gram panchayats.
- Garhbeta III community development block consists of rural areas with 8 gram panchayats and three census towns: Durllabhganj, Dwari Geria and Naba Kola.
- Keshpur community development block consists of rural areas only with 15 gram panchayats.
- Salboni community development block consists of rural areas only with 10 gram panchayats.

==== Ghatal subdivision ====
- Five municipalities: Ramjibanpur, Chandrakona, Khirpai, Kharar and Ghatal.
- Chandrakona I community development block consists of rural areas only with 6 gram panchayats.
- Chandrakona II community development block consists of rural areas only with 6 gram panchayats.
- Daspur I community development block consists of rural areas only with 10 gram panchayats.
- Daspur II community development block consists of rural areas only with 14 gram panchayats.
- Ghatal community development block consists of rural areas only with 12 gram panchayats.

=== Assembly Constituencies ===
There are 15 assembly constituencies in Paschim Medinipur district. They belong to four Lok Sabha constituencies. Medinipur and Ghatal constituencies both comprise six constituencies of Paschim Medinipur district and one from Purba Medinipur district. Jhargram constituency contains two constituencies of Paschim Medinipur district, while Arambagh contains one constituency.

No.	Name	Lok Sabha	MLA	2026 Winner	2024 Lead
219	Dantan	Medinipur	Ajit Kumar Jana	Bharatiya Janata Party	Trinamool Congress
223	Keshiary (ST)	Medinipur	Bhadra Hemram	Bharatiya Janata Party	Trinamool Congress
224	Kharagpur Sadar	Medinipur	Dilip Ghosh	Bharatiya Janata Party	Bharatiya Janata Party
225	Narayangarh	Medinipur	Rama Prasad Giri	Bharatiya Janata Party	Trinamool Congress
226	Sabang	Ghatal	Amal Kumar Panda	Bharatiya Janata Party	Trinamool Congress
227	Pingla	Ghatal	Swagata Manna	Bharatiya Janata Party	Trinamool Congress
228	Kharagpur	Medinipur	Dinen Roy	Trinamool Congress	Trinamool Congress
229	Debra	Ghatal	Subhashis Om	Bharatiya Janata Party	Trinamool Congress
230	Daspur	Ghatal	Tapan Kumar Dutta	Bharatiya Janata Party	Trinamool Congress
231	Ghatal (SC)	Ghatal	Sital Kapat	Bharatiya Janata Party	Trinamool Congress
232	Chandrakona (SC)	Arambagh	Sukanta Dolui	Bharatiya Janata Party	Trinamool Congress
233	Garbeta	Jhargram	Pradip Lodha	Bharatiya Janata Party	Trinamool Congress
234	Salboni	Jhargram	Biman Mahata	Bharatiya Janata Party	Trinamool Congress
235	Keshpur (SC)	Ghatal	Seuli Saha	Trinamool Congress	Trinamool Congress
236	Medinipur	Medinipur	Shankar Guchhait	Bharatiya Janata Party	Trinamool Congress

== Demographics ==
Historical population
Year	Pop.	±%
1901	1,520,130	—
1911	1,537,618	+1.2%
1921	1,453,390	−5.5%
1931	1,525,569	+5.0%
1941	1,738,975	+14.0%
1951	1,830,743	+5.3%
1961	2,380,446	+30.0%
1971	3,035,385	+27.5%
1981	3,697,899	+21.8%
1991	4,486,279	+21.3%
2001	5,193,411	+15.8%
2011	5,913,457	+13.9%
Source: censusindia.gov.in

According to the 2011 census Paschim Medinipur district has a population of 5,913,457, roughly equal to the nation of Eritrea or the US state of Missouri. This gives it a ranking of 14th in India (out of a total of 640). The district has a population density of 636 inhabitants per square kilometre (1,650/sq mi). Its population growth rate over the decade 2001–2011 was 14.44%. Paschim Medinipur has a sex ratio of 960 females for every 1000 males, and a literacy rate of 79.04%. Scheduled Castes and Scheduled Tribes collectively account for 33.96% (SC: 19.08% and ST: 14.88%) of the district's total population. The prominent communities in this group, in terms of the district's total population, are Santal (9.05%), Bagdi/Duley (6.27%), Bhumij (1.65%), Lohar (1.33%), Namasudra (1.3%), Munda (1.13%), Jalia Kaibartta (1.02%), Lodha/Kharia (0.88%), (Note: Although the Kharia and Lodha are two distinct tribes, they interchangeably utilize their respective names and commonly use the honorific name of Sabar/Savar, which is also a name of another tribe.) Dhoba (0.83%), Hari/Mehtar (0.81%), Bauri (0.76%), Mal (0.6%), Dom (0.56%), Chamar (0.53%), Bhuiya (0.53%), Kora (0.49%), Rajbanshi (0.43%), Pan/Sawasi (0.38%), Sunri (excluding Saha) (0.34%), Keot/Keyot (0.33%), Kandra (0.31%), Savar (0.31%), Rajwar (0.26%), Ho (0.25%), Mahar (0.24%), Kadar (0.23%), Baiga (0.22%), Mahali (0.21%), Khaira (0.2%), and Pod/Poundra (0.19%).

After bifurcation, the district had a population of 4,776,909, of which 655,250 (13.72%) live in urban areas. The divided district has a sex ratio of 963 females per 1000 males. Scheduled Castes and Scheduled Tribes make up 892,763 (18.69%) and 546,167 (11.43%) of the population, respectively.

=== Religion ===
Religion in Paschim Medinipur district (2011)
Hinduism	85.26%
Islam	12.41%
Other (tribal religion)	1.52%
Other or not stated	0.81%

=== Language ===
Languages of Paschim Medinipur district (2011)
1. Bengali (87.2%)
2. Santali (6.29%)
3. Hindi (2.49%)
4. Telugu (0.93%)
5. Others (3.14%)

At the 2011 census, 87.15% spoke Bengali, 6.29% Santali, 2.49% Hindi and 0.93% Telugu as their first language. Other languages spoken in the district include Odia, Urdu, Kudmali/Kurmali, Mundari and Koda.

== Culture ==
=== Tourism ===
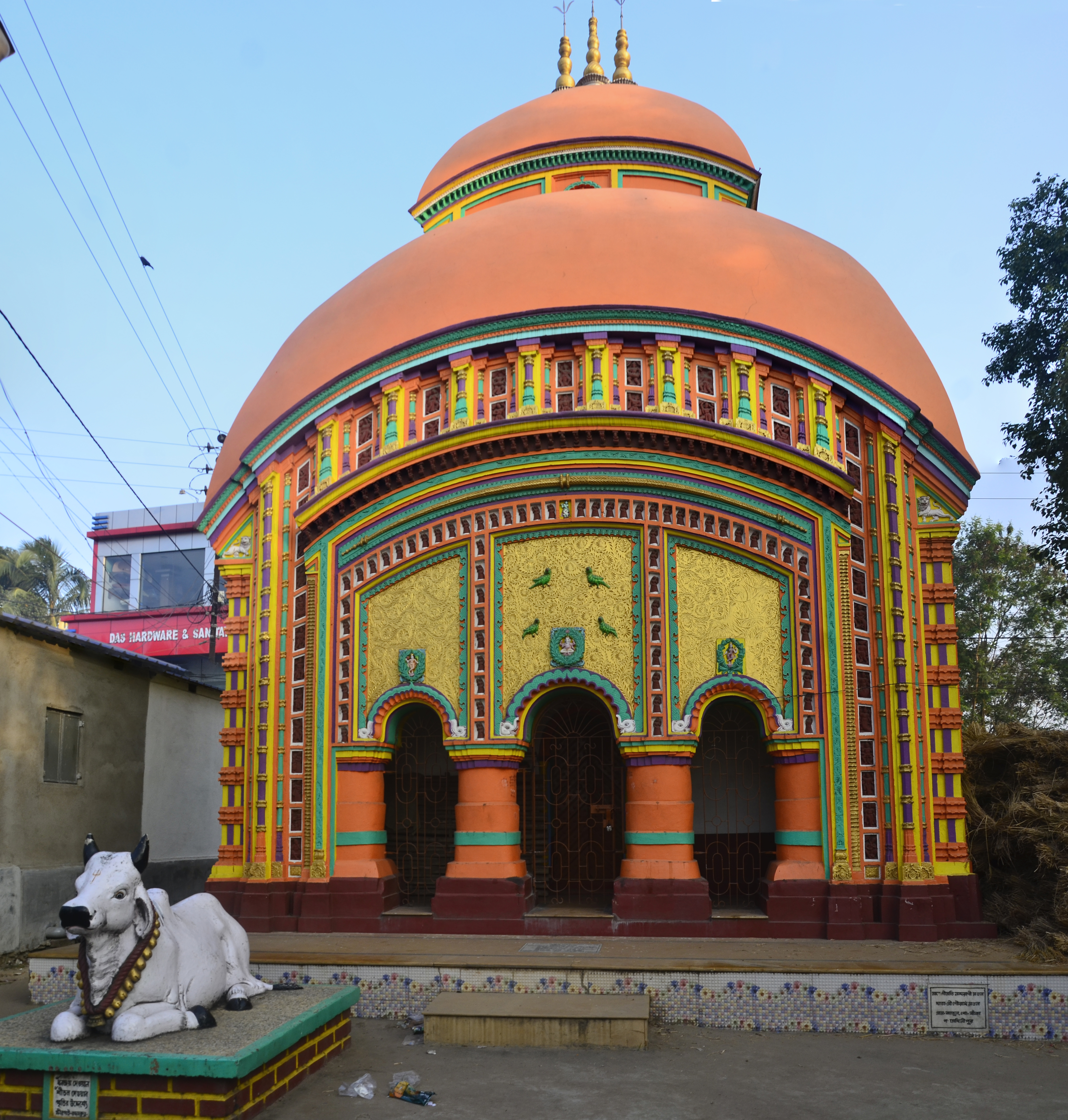
Aatchala Khargesvara Temple at Kshirpai of Paschim Medinipur district

There are many tourist attractions in the district:

- Patachitra Village (Naya, Pingla)
- Gopegarh Heritage Park
- Hatibari Forest banglow and Jhilli Pakhiralay
- Gurguripal Heritage Park
- Parimalkanan park, CKT
- Gangani Garhbeta
- Kriya Yoga Ashram, Chaipat Satmatha
- Raj Rajeswar Temple, Chaipat
- Rameshwar Temple, near Rohini (On the bank of Subarnarekha river with nearby green forest called Tapoban)
- Gourya Temple, near Kharagpur
- Bisnu Temple, Kultikri
- Rashikananda Memorial, Rohini
- Birthplace of Iswar Chandra Vidyasagar, Birsingha Village
- Mogolmari Boudhabihar, Mogolmari, Dantan
- Prayag Film City, Midnapore Film City or Chandrakona Film City at Chandrakona Road

== Education ==
=== Universities and colleges ===
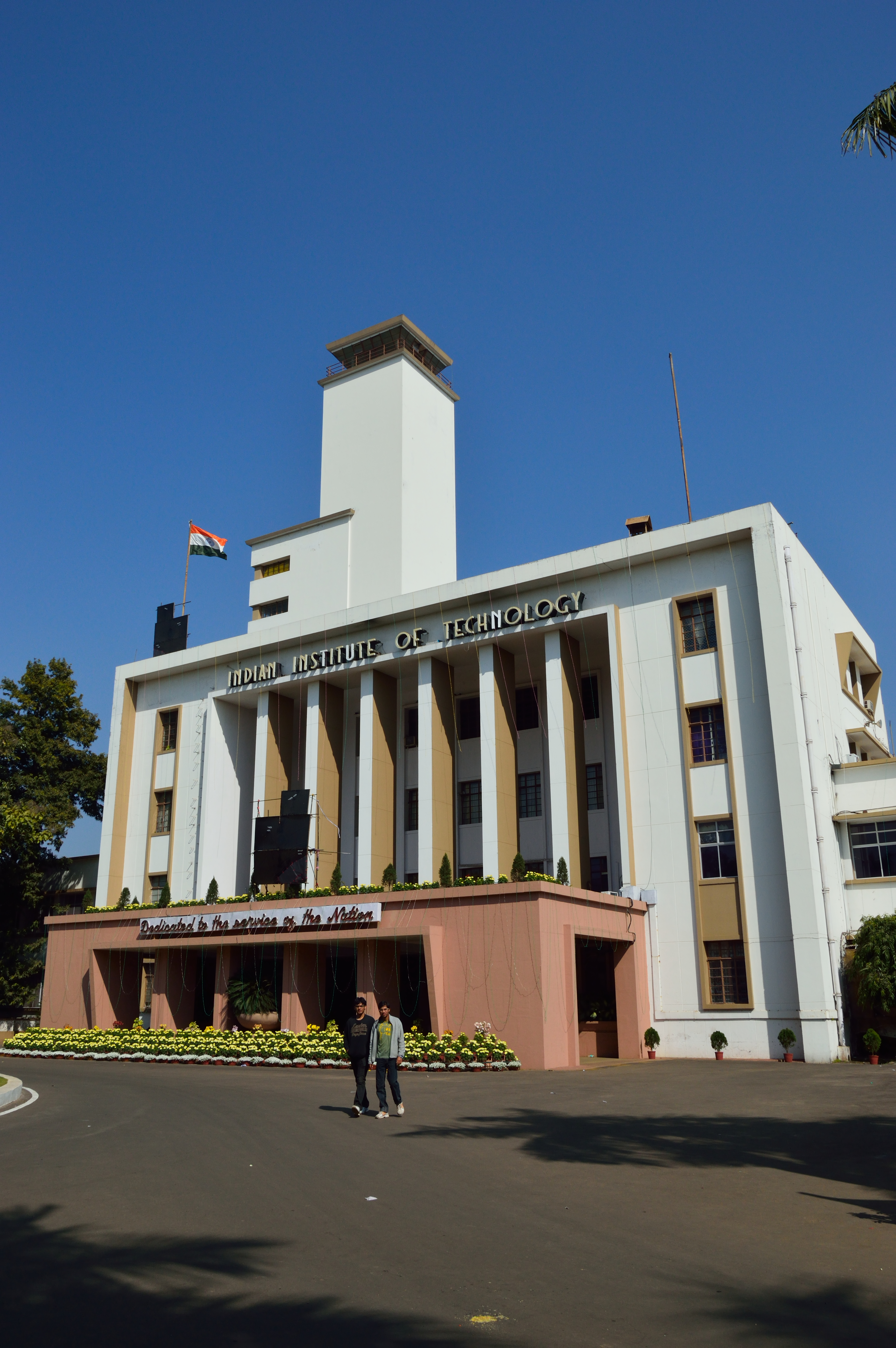
Main Building, Indian Institute of Technology, Kharagpur

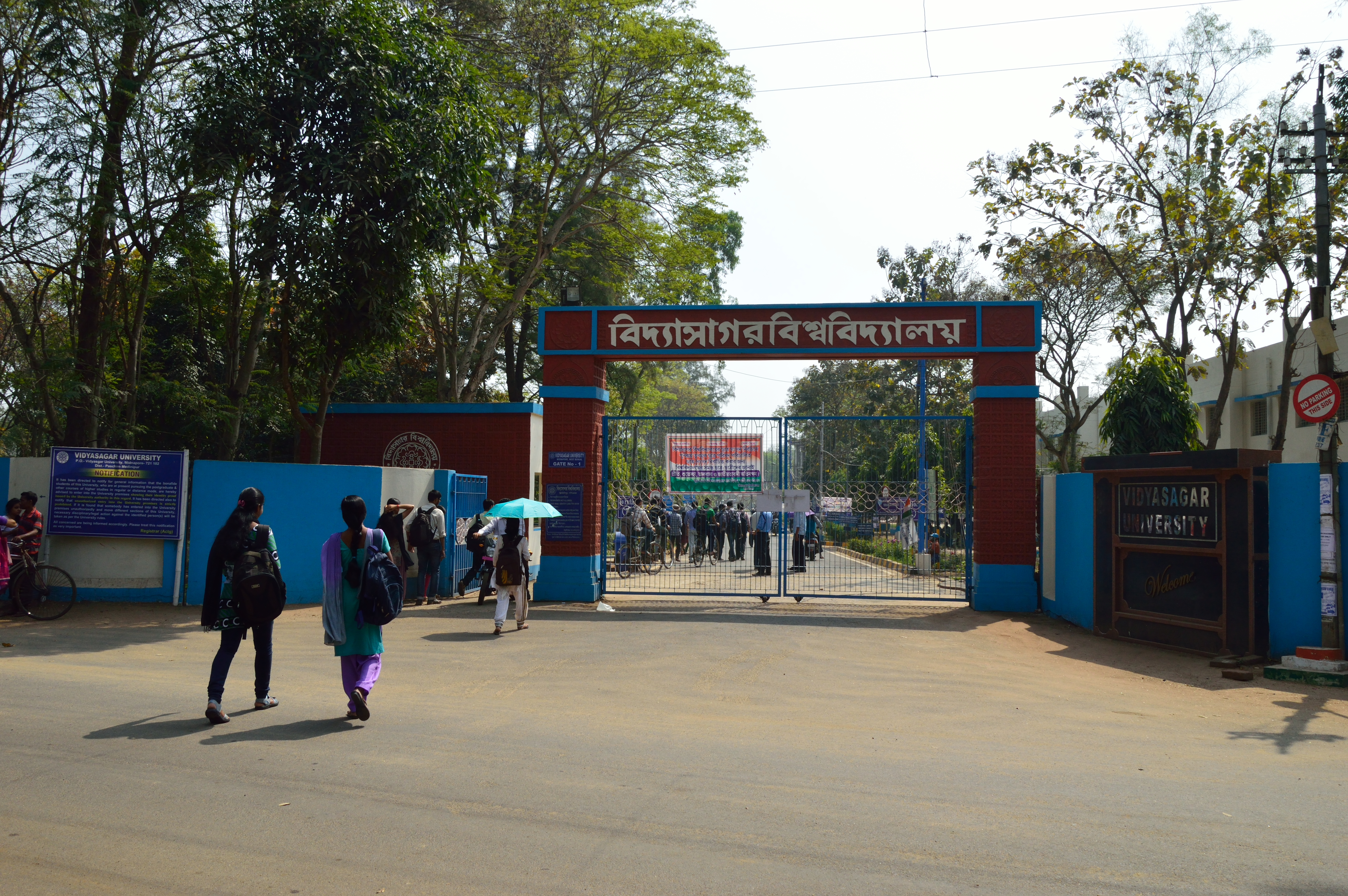
Gate No. 1, Vidyasagar University, Medinipur-2

- Belda College
- Dr B C Roy Institute of Medical Sciences & Research
- IIT Kharagpur
- Institute of Science & Technology
- Kharagpur Homoeopathic Medical College and Hospital
- Midnapore College (Autonomous) (formerly known as Day college)
- Midnapore Homoeopathic Medical College and Hospital
- Midnapore Medical College and Hospital
- Raja Narendra Lal Khan Women's College
- Vidyasagar University

== Healthcare ==
The table below (all data in numbers) presents an overview of the subdivision-wise medical facilities available and patients treated, after the separation of Jhargram, in the hospitals, health centres and sub-centres in 2014 in Paschim Medinipur district.

Subdivision	Health & Family Welfare Dept, WB				Other state govt depts	Local bodies	Central govt depts / PSUs	NGO / private nursing homes	Total	Total number of beds	Total number of doctors	Indoor patients	Outdoor patients
Subdivision	Hospitals	Rural hospitals	Block primary health centres	Primary health centres	Other state govt depts	Local bodies	Central govt depts / PSUs	NGO / private nursing homes	Total	Total number of beds	Total number of doctors	Indoor patients	Outdoor patients
Medinipur Sadar	2	5	1	15	3	-	1	26	53	2,117	323	121,486	1,375,817
Kharagpur	2	8	2	27	2	1	2	54	98	1841	197	93,110	1,814,309
Ghatal	1	4	1	15	-	-	-	46	67	988	66	46,006	742,984
Paschim Medinipur district	5	17	24	77	5	1	3	126	208	4,946	586*	260,602	3,933,110

- Excluding nursing homes

== Notable people ==
- Serajuddin Ahmad, MLA for Midnapore
- Syed Shah Mehr Ali Alquadri Al Baghdadi (1808–1868), Sufi saint
- Sheikh Siraj Ali, politician
- Tamal Bandyopadhyay, Indian business journalist
- Syed Shamsul Bari, politician
- Rajnarayan Basu, writer and proponent of Young Bengal movement
- Anirban Bhattacharya, actor in Tollywood movies
- Khudiram Bose, one of the youngest martyrs of the Indian Independence Movement.
- Soumya Sankar Bose, Photographer
- Byomkes Chakrabarti, Linguist, writer and poet
- Ramapada Chowdhury, Bengali author and editor
- Souhardya De, orientalist and Bal Puraskar recipient
- Mahasweta Devi, writer and Magsaysay Award winner
- Nirmal Jibon Ghosh, revolutionary
- Sheikh Najmul Haque, six-term legislator
- Syed Moazzam Hossain, politician
- Sheikh Humayun Kabir, state minister
- Hemchandra Kanungo, an Indian nationalist and prime organiser of Anushilan Samiti
- Sheikh Jahangir Karim, teacher and politician
- Ghulam Faruque Khan, politician and businessman
- Selima Khatun, teacher and politician
- Abha Maiti, freedom fighter, former minister of West Bengal and Government of India
- Moulana Muhammad Momtaz, Islamic scholar and politician
- Mohiuddin Nawab, novelist, screenwriter and poet
- Tawfique Nawaz, lawyer
- Anath Bondhu Panja, freedom fighter, member of the Bengal Volunteers, martyred after successfully assassinating oppressive District magistrate Bernard E. J. Burge.
- Narayan Chandra Rana, scientist
- Suhrawardy family
  - Begum Badar un nissa Akhtar, social reformer
  - Khujista Akhtar Banu, writer and educationist
  - Abdullah Al-Mamun Suhrawardy, Islamic scholar, barrister and academic
  - Hasan Shaheed Suhrawardy, diplomat and poet
  - Huseyn Shaheed Suhrawardy, Chief Minister of Bengal during British period, Prime Minister of Pakistan and founder of the Awami League
  - Ubaidullah Al Ubaidi Suhrawardy, Islamic scholar, educationist and author
  - Zahid Suhrawardy, jurist
  - Begum Akhtar Sulaiman, social worker and political activist
- Ishwar Chandra Vidyasagar, reformer and philanthropist, key figure of the Bengal Renaissance.
- Zamindar family of Midnapore
  - Sir Abdur Rahim KCSI, President of India
  - Jalaludin Abdur Rahim, diplomat and political philosopher
