= Kharar, Ghatal =

Kharar খড়ার or खड़ार
- City
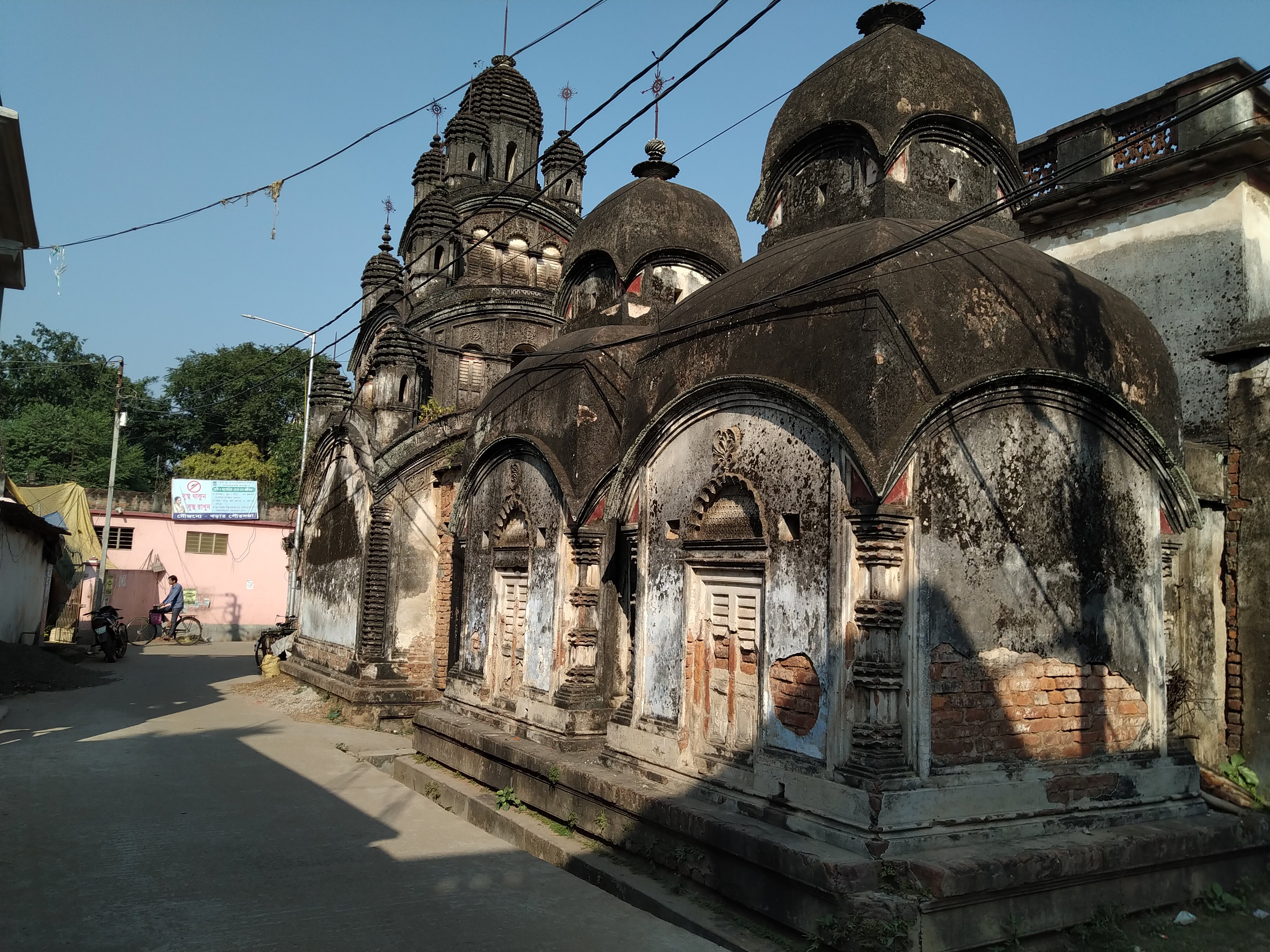
- Sita Rama Temple in Kharar
- Nickname: Kharar Ghatal
- Location in West Bengal, India Kharar (India)
- Coordinates: 22.7°N 87.68°E
- Country: India
- State: West Bengal
- District: Paschim Medinipur

Government
  - Type: Municipality
  - Body: Kharar Municipality
- Elevation: 6 m (20 ft)

Population (2011)
  - Total: 12,118

Languages
  - Official: Bengali, English, Hindi
- Time zone: UTC+5:30 (IST)
- Postal code: 721222
- Vehicle registration: WB50 WB36
- Website: paschimmedinipur.gov.in

Kharar is a historical town of Ghatal and one of the oldest towns in Asia. This city is located in the Ghatal Subdivision of the Indian state of West Bengal. This town was part of Hooghly District, eventually being merged with the Medinipur district.

== History ==
In 1884, according to section 8 of the then Bengal Municipality Act Kharar municipality had been established with Rayerdanga, Krishnapur, Udaygunge and Dalapatipur village under its jurisdiction. Initially Kharar was under Arambagh subdivision of Hooghly district. Later it was transferred to Ghatal subdivision of Paschim Medinipur

== Geography ==
Cities and towns in Ghatal subdivision of Paschim Medinipur district
M: municipal city/ town, R: rural/ urban centre, H: historical/ religious centre
Owing to space constraints in the small map, the actual locations in a larger map may vary slightly

=== Location ===
Kharar is located at 22.7°N 87.68°E.

=== Area overview ===
Ishwar Chandra Vidyasagar, scholar, social reformer and a key figure of the Bengal Renaissance, was born at Birsingha on 26 September 1820.

Ghatal subdivision, shown in the map alongside, has alluvial soils. Around 85% of the total cultivated area is cropped more than once. It has a density of population of 1,099 per km^{2}, but being a small subdivision only a little over a fifth of the people in the district reside in this subdivision. 14.33% of the population lives in urban areas and 86.67% lives in the rural areas.

Note: The map alongside presents some of the notable locations in the subdivision. All places marked in the map are linked in the larger full screen map.

== Economy ==
In ancient times, this area was known for its brass and bell utensils and as goldsmiths.

The principal crops are paddy and potato.

Kharar, along with the neighbouring areas and neighbouring cities like Ghatal, Chandrakona and Ramjibanpur are known for the manufacture of brass and bell metal.

== Administration ==
Kharar is administered by the Kharar Municipality. Kharar municipality was established in 1888. The Kharar city is divided into 10 wards for which elections are held every 5 years.

== Demographics ==
As per 2011 Census of India, Kharar had a total population of 12,118 of which 6,124 (51%) were males and 5,994 (49%) were females. Population in the age range 0–6 years was 1,167. The total number of literate persons in Kharar was 9,364 (85.51% of the population over 6 years).

As of 2001 India census, Kharar had a population of 11,580. Males constitute 51% of the population and females 49%. Kharar has an average literacy rate of 74%, higher than the national average of 59.5%: male literacy is 81%, and female literacy is 67%. In Kharar, 11% of the population is under 6 years of age.

== Education ==
There are two high school and more than ten primary schools in Kharar. The name of the high schools are - 1. Kharar Sri Aurobindo Vidyamandir. 2. Kharar S.K.H.Hait Balika Vidyalaya. Ghatal Satabarsiki Mahavidyalaya and Chandrakona Vidyasagar Mahavidyalaya are two nearest college of Kharar.

== Culture ==
David J. McCutchion mentions:

- The Sitaram temple of the Maji family as a standard three-storied trayodashratna structure, built in 1865, measuring 15’ square with terracotta and stucco decorations.
- The Narayana temple of the Santra family as a flat roofed structure decorated with pinnacles, 19th century built with terracotta decorations.
- The Shiva temple as a rekha deul or pirha deul, with a pirha porch of base dimension smaller than the main temple, measuring 13’ 9” square + 12’ 6” square, brick built in the 18th century, with terracotta figures.
- A temple with some decoration as a pancha-ratna with smooth rekha turrets,.
- A temple with some decoration as a West Bengal nava-ratna with ridged turrets.
- The Narayan temple at Rayapara as a straight-corniced nava-ratna or a double-storied flat roof temple with turrets
- There is shani temple, sukumar harh is the priest of this temple
- Bhatpukur Kali Puja is also there

== Kharar picture gallery ==
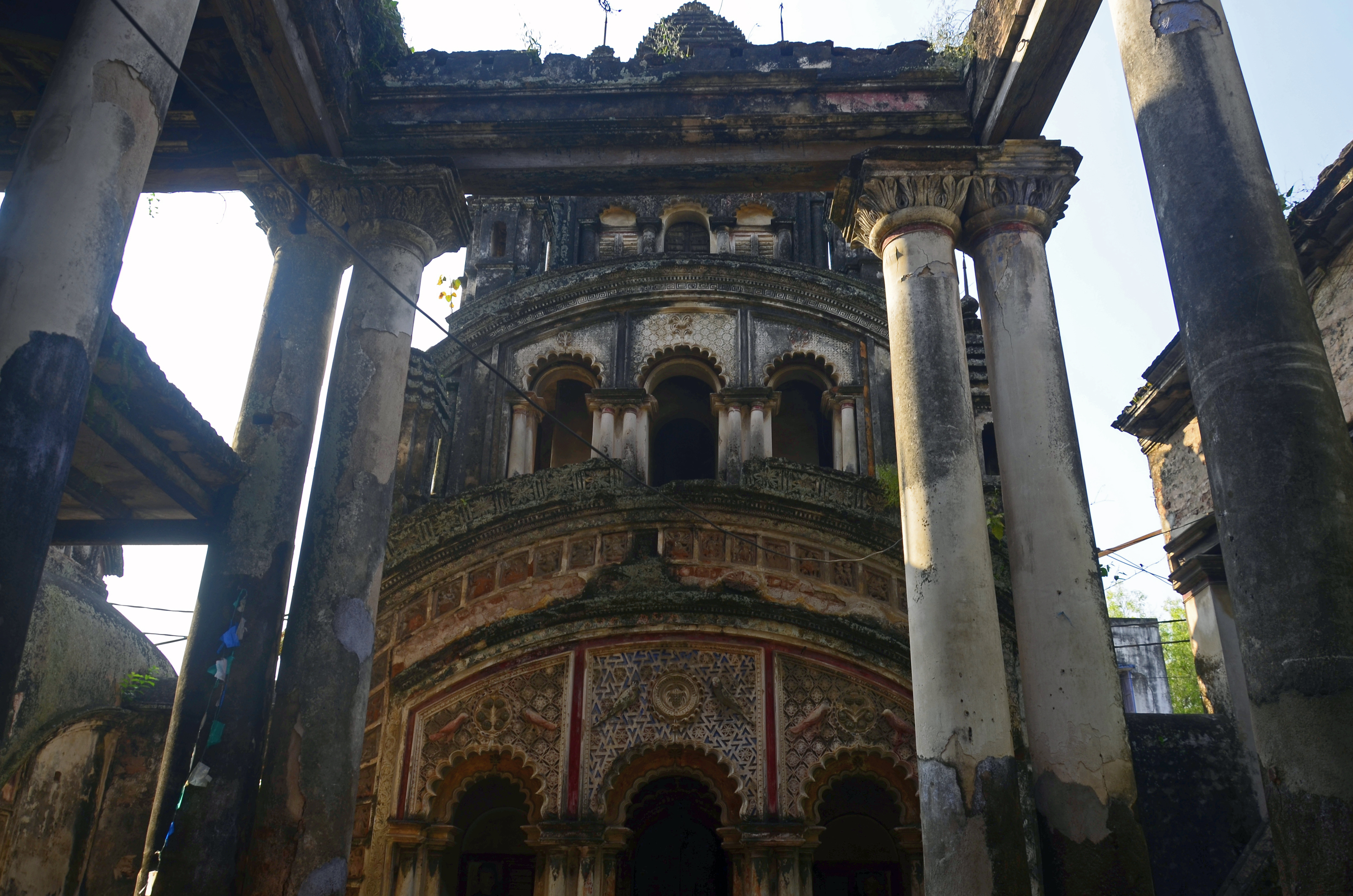
Sita Rama temple of Maji family with 13 pinnacles

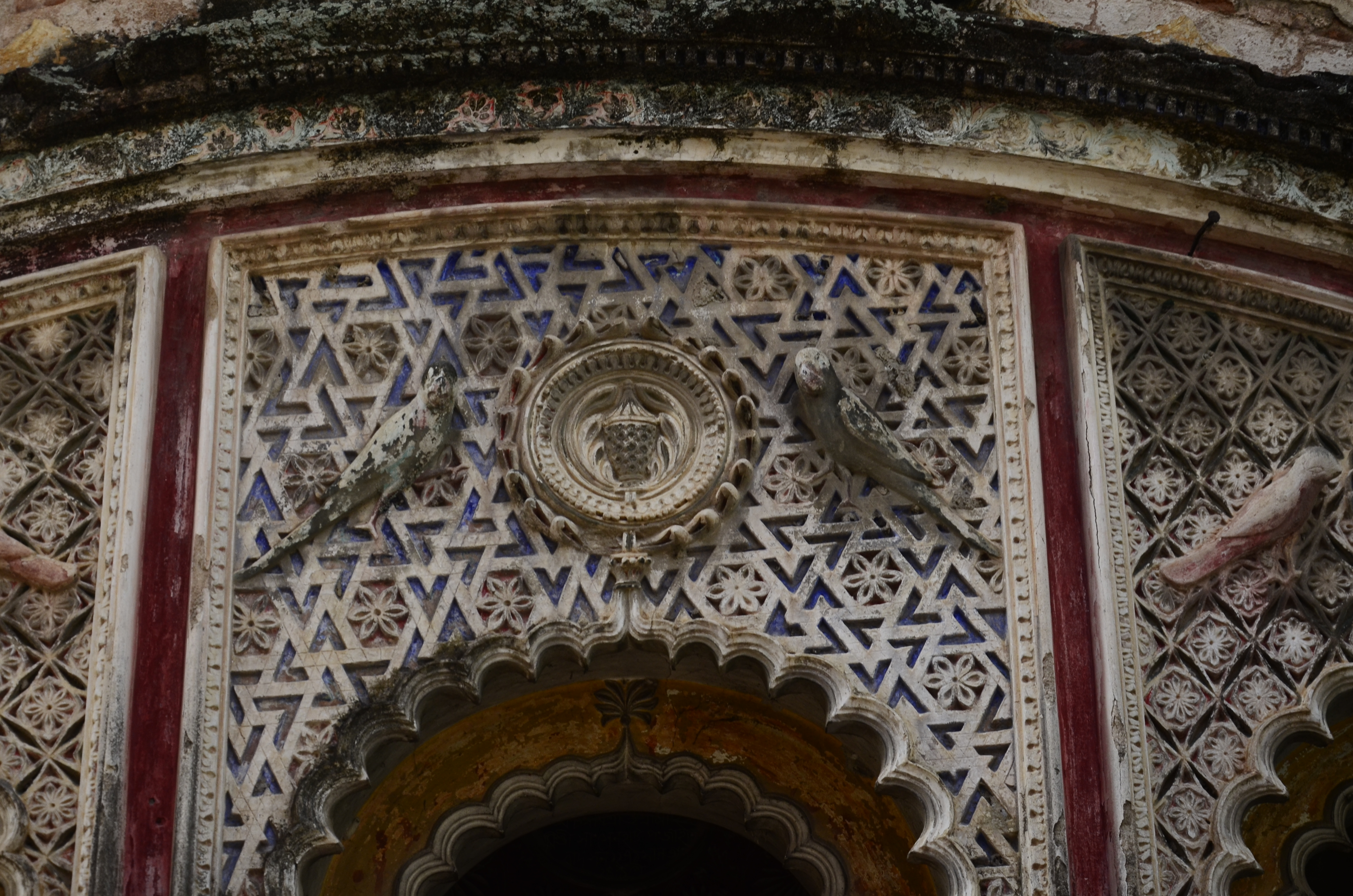
Stucco work in the Sitarñ Rama temple

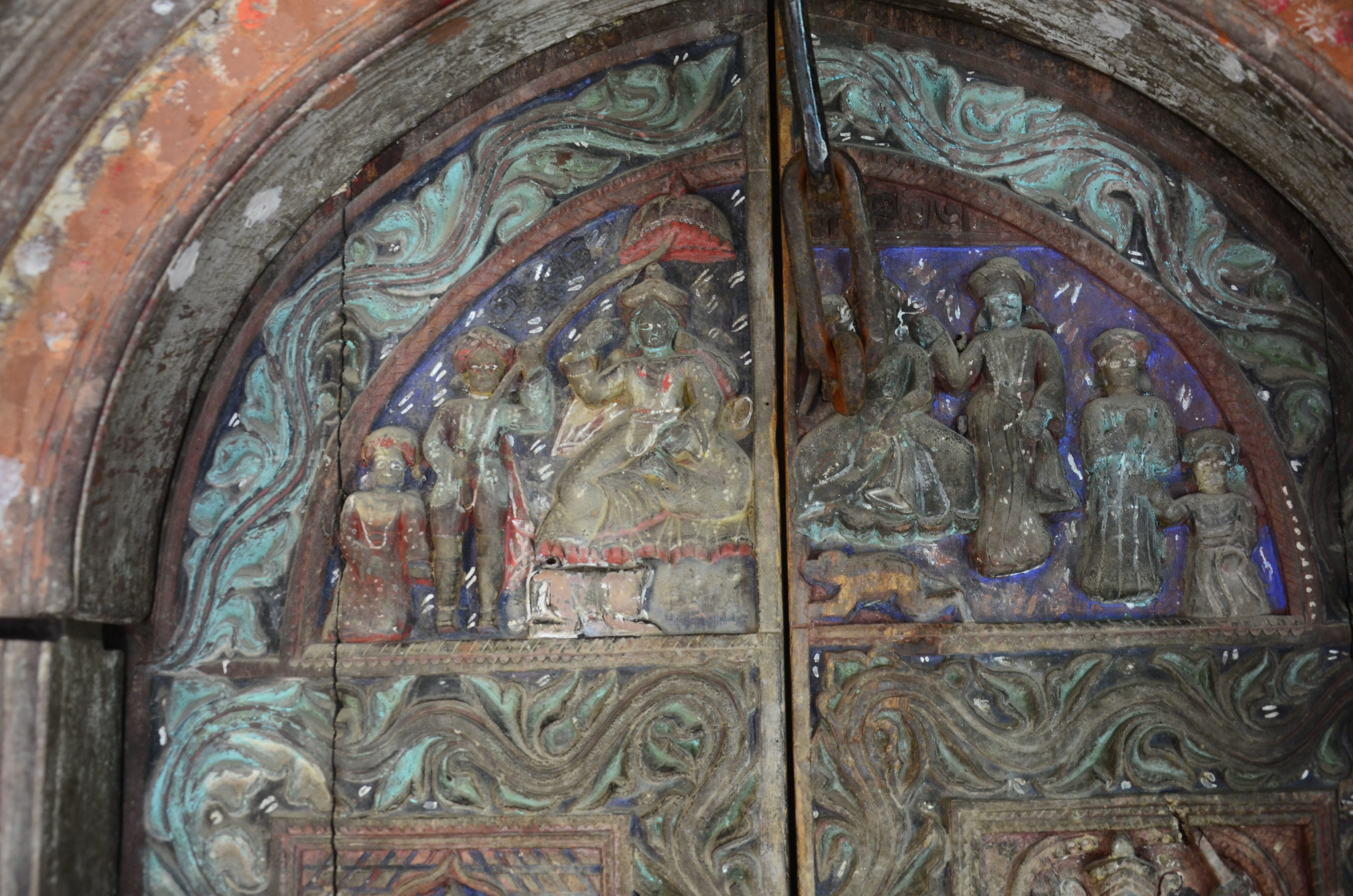
Carved wooden door in the Sita Rama temple

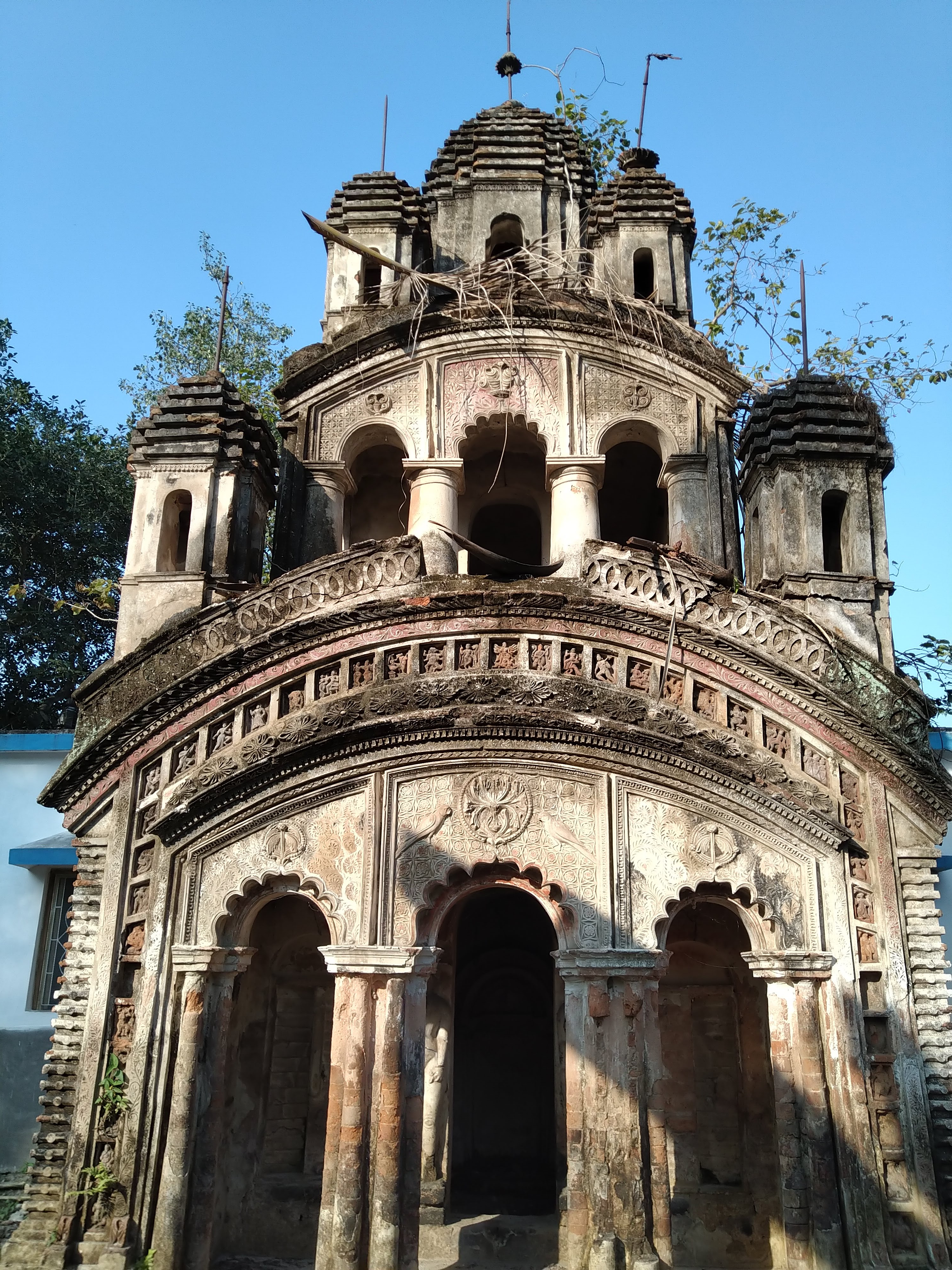
Sitala temple of Mondal family with 9 pinnacles
