= Ramjibanpur =

- City
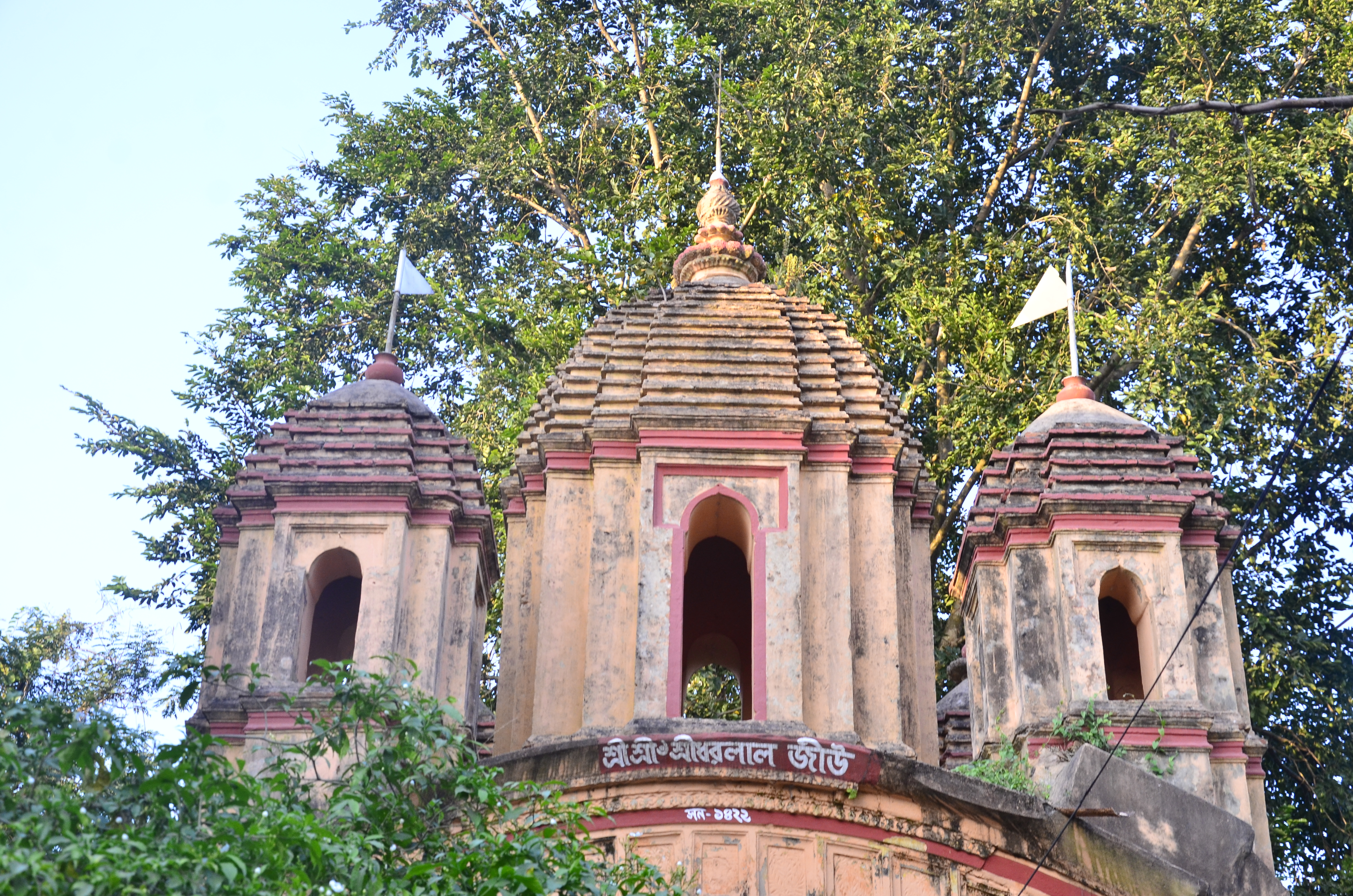
- Sridharlaljiu temple in Ramjibanpur

- Location in West Bengal, India Ramjibanpur (India)
- Coordinates: 22.83°N 87.62°E
- Country: India
- State: West Bengal
- District: Paschim Medinipur

Government
  - Type: Municipality
  - Body: Ramjibanpur Municipality
- Elevation: 11 m (36 ft)

Population (2011)
  - Total: 19,611

Languages
  - Official: Bengali, English
- Time zone: UTC+5:30 (IST)
- PIN: 721242
- Lok Sabha constituency: Arambagh
- Vidhan Sabha constituency: Chandrakona
- Website: ramjibonpurmuniciality.org.in

Ramjibanpur is a city and a municipality in the Ghatal subdivision of the Paschim Medinipur district in the Indian state of West Bengal.

== Geography ==
Cities and towns in Ghatal subdivision of Paschim Medinipur district
M: municipal city/ town, R: rural/ urban centre, H: historical/ religious centre
Owing to space constraints in the small map, the actual locations in a larger map may vary slightly

=== Location ===
Ramjibanpur is located at 22.83°N 87.62°E, at an average elevation of 11 metres (36 feet).

=== Area overview ===
Ishwar Chandra Vidyasagar, scholar, social reformer and a key figure of the Bengal Renaissance, was born at Birsingha on 26 September 1820.

Ghatal subdivision, shown in the map alongside, has alluvial soils. Around 85% of the total cultivated area is cropped more than once. It has a density of population of 1,099 per km^{2}, but being a small subdivision only a little over a fifth of the people in the district reside in this subdivision. 14.33% of the population lives in urban areas and the rest in the rural areas.

Note: The map alongside presents some of the notable locations in the subdivision. All places marked in the map are linked in the larger full screen map.

== Demographics ==
As per 2011 Census of India, Ramjibanpur had a population of 19,611 of which 10,030 (51%) were males and 9,581 (49%) females. Population in the age range 0–6 years was 2,109. The total number of literate persons in Ramjibanpur was 14,735 (84.19% of the population over 6 years).

As of 2001 India census, Ramjibanpur had a population of 17,363. Males constitute 51% of the population and females 49%. Ramjibanpur has an average literacy rate of 72%, higher than the national average of 59.5%: male literacy is 78%, and female literacy is 66%. In Ramjibanpur, 14% of the population is under 6 years of age.

== Culture ==
David J. McCutchion mentions:

- The Vishnu temple in Dayalbazar as a small flat roofed or chandni type, with terracotta decoration, built in 1833, measuring 14’ square’
- The Radhakanta temple in Natunhat, in the same category as the Vishnu temple, with terracotta decoration, built in 1829, measuring 14’ 10” x 15’.
- The Sridhara and Shiva temples (two attached temples), in the same category as the Vishnu temple, with extended façade for extra chambers, plain, measuring 24’ 3” x 3’.
- a pancha-ratna temple with ridged rekha turrets and porch on triple archway, of the standard West Bengal type with facades fully decorated.
- a pancha-ratna with ridged rekha turrets and single entrance with figures above the archway and around the façade.
- a West Bengal nava-ratna, with terracotta decoration, now fallen to ruin.

== Ramjibanpur picture gallery ==
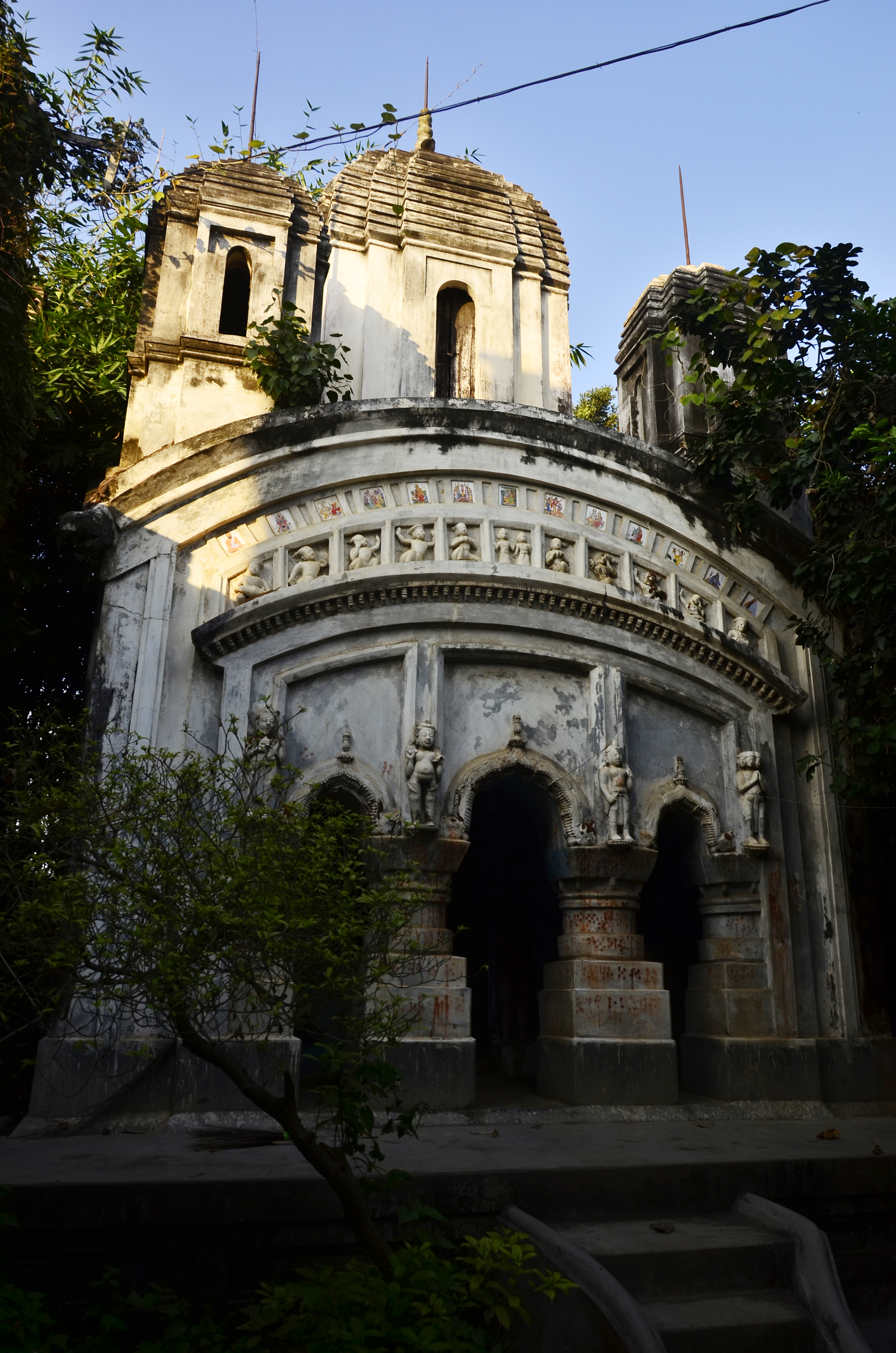
Damodar temple of Piri family

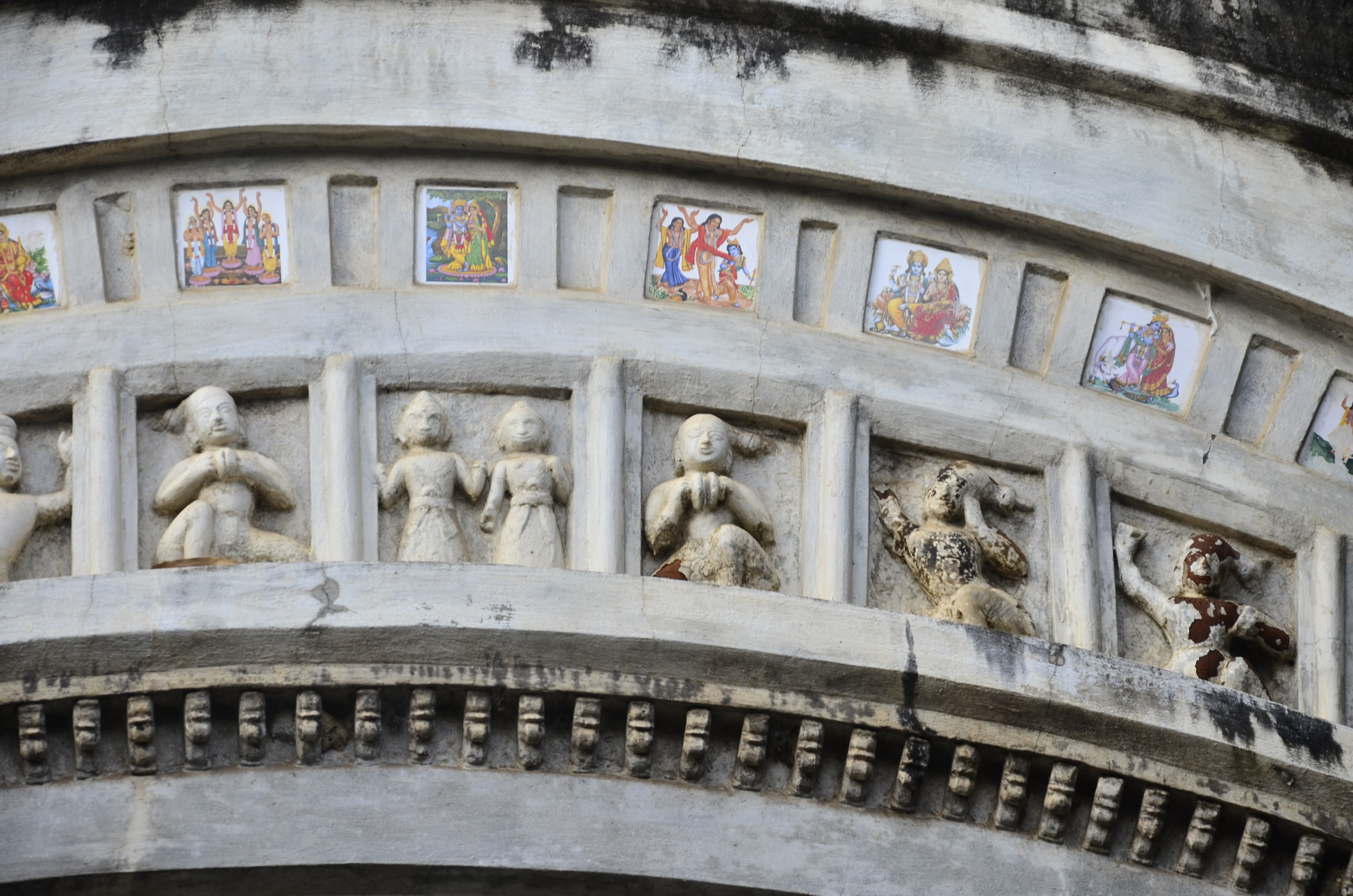
Damodar temple

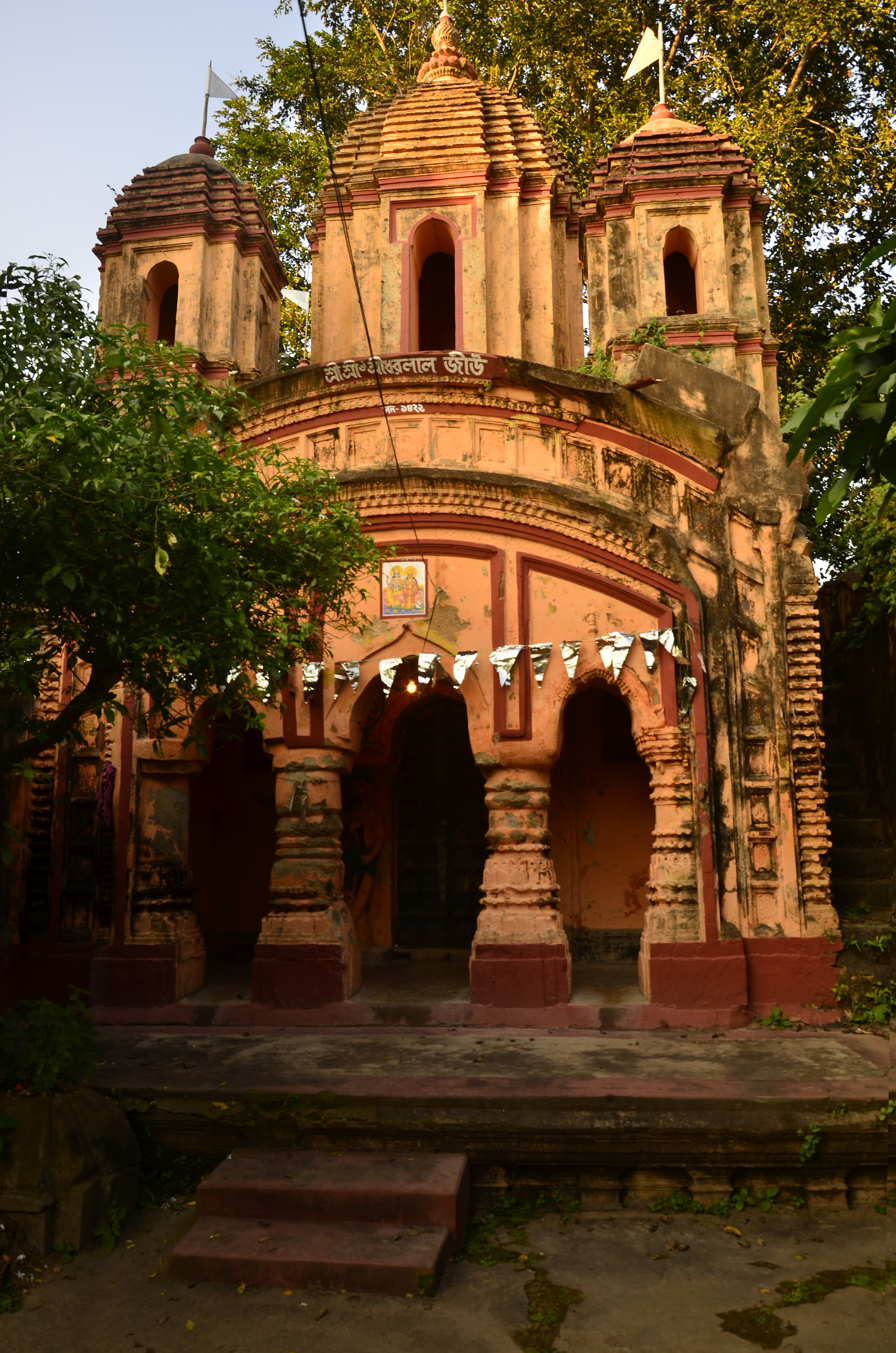
Sridharlaljiu temple of Piri family

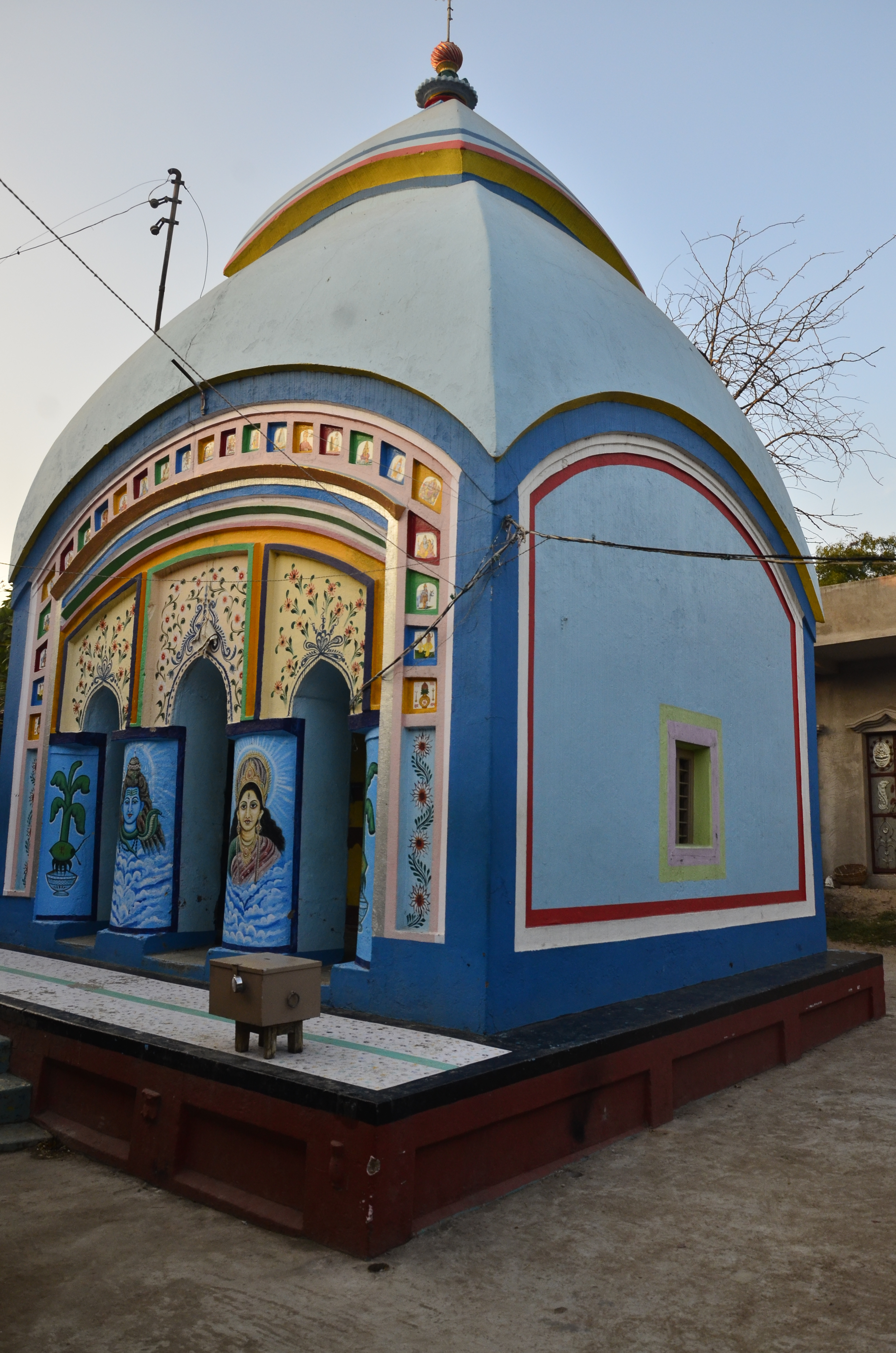
Buro Shiva temple, possibly built in 1866

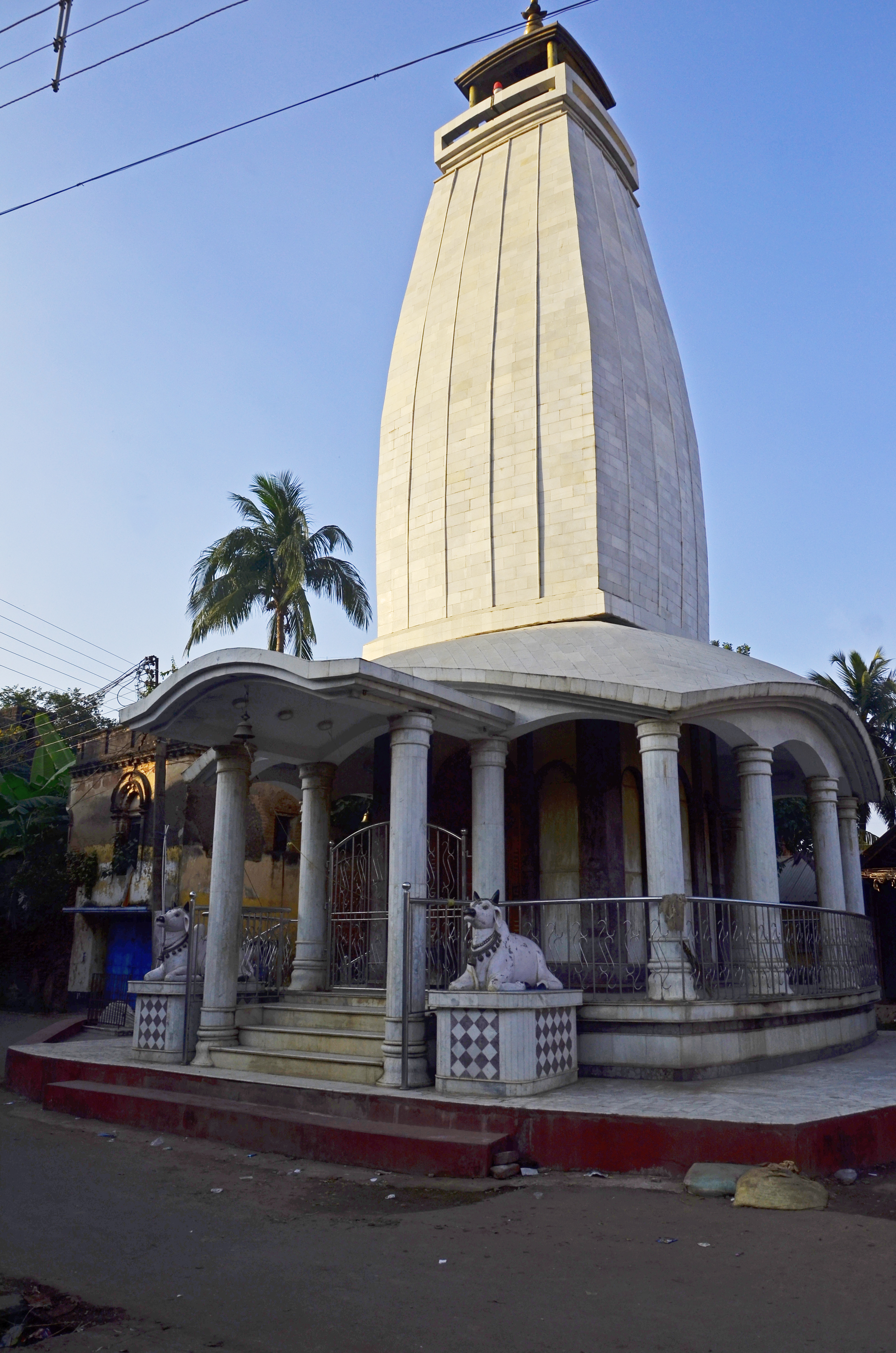
Parbatinath temple: the old temple built in 1801-02 collapsed and this new temple was built
