= Sital Kapat =

Indian politician

Member of the West Bengal Legislative Assembly
- In office 2 May 2021 – Incumbent
- Preceded by: Shankar Dolai
- Constituency: Ghatal

Personal details
- Born: June 6, 1989 (age 37)
- Party: Bharatiya Janata Party
- Education: 12th Pass
- Profession: Private Tutor

Sital Kapat is an Indian politician from Bharatiya Janata Party. In May 2021, he was elected as a member of the West Bengal Legislative Assembly from Ghatal (constituency). He defeated Shankar Dolai of All India Trinamool Congress by 966 votes in 2021 West Bengal Assembly election.
