= Sonakhali =

Sonakhali may refer to:

- Sonakhali, Basanti, South 24 Parganas district, West Bengal, India
- Sonakhali, Paschim Medinipur
