= Ajuria =

- Village
- Location in West Bengal, India Ajuria (India)
- Coordinates: 22.5284°N 87.7794°E
- Country: India
- State: West Bengal
- District: Paschim Medinipur

Population (2011)
  - Total: 1,811

Languages
  - Official: Bengali, English
- Time zone: UTC+5:30 (IST)
- PIN: 721146
- Telephone/STD code: 03225
- Lok Sabha constituency: Ghatal
- Vidhan Sabha constituency: Daspur
- Website: paschimmedinipur.gov.in

Ajuria (also spelled Ajurya) is a village in the Daspur II CD block in the Ghatal subdivision of the Paschim Medinipur district in the state of West Bengal, India.

== Geography ==
Cities and towns in Ghatal subdivision of Paschim Medinipur district
M: municipal city/ town, R: rural/ urban centre, H: historical/ religious centre
Owing to space constraints in the small map, the actual locations in a larger map may vary slightly

=== Location ===
Ajuria is located at 22.5284°N 87.7794°E.

=== Area overview ===
Ishwar Chandra Vidyasagar, scholar, social reformer and a key figure of the Bengal Renaissance, was born at Birsingha on 26 September 1820.

Ghatal subdivision, shown in the map alongside, has alluvial soils. Around 85% of the total cultivated area is cropped more than once. It has a density of population of 1,099 per km^{2}, but being a small subdivision only a little over a fifth of the people in the district reside in this subdivision. 14.33% of the population lives in urban areas and 86.67% lives in the rural areas.

Note: The map alongside presents some of the notable locations in the subdivision. All places marked in the map are linked in the larger full screen map.

== Demographics ==
According to the 2011 Census of India, Ajurya had a total population of 1,811, of which 917 (51%) were males and 894 (49%) were females. There were 190 persons in the age range of 0–6 years. The total number of literate persons in Ajurya was 1,355 (83.59% of the population over 6 years).

== Ajuria picture gallery ==
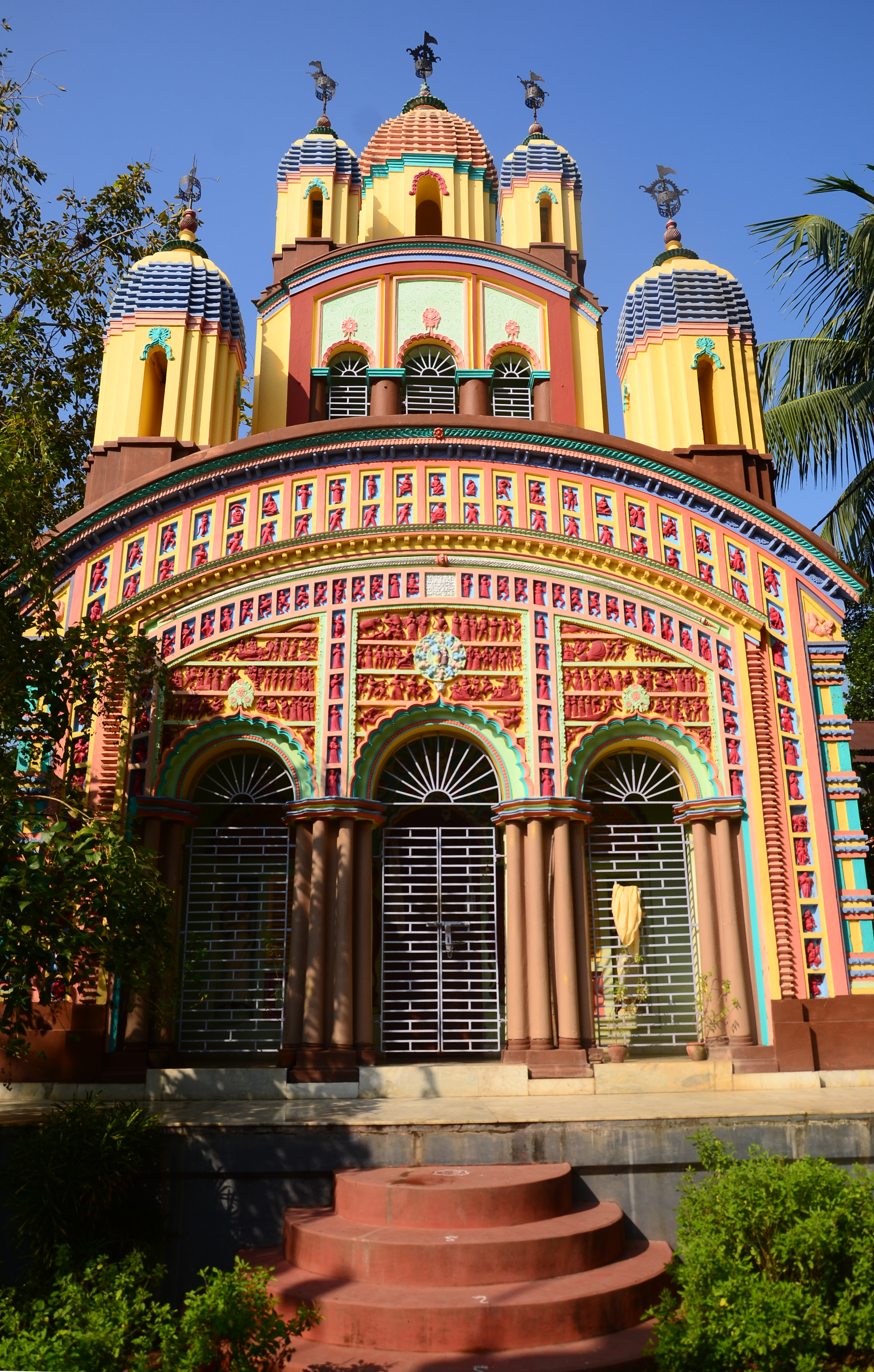
nava-ratna Lakshmi Janardana temple of Charan family, built in 1793

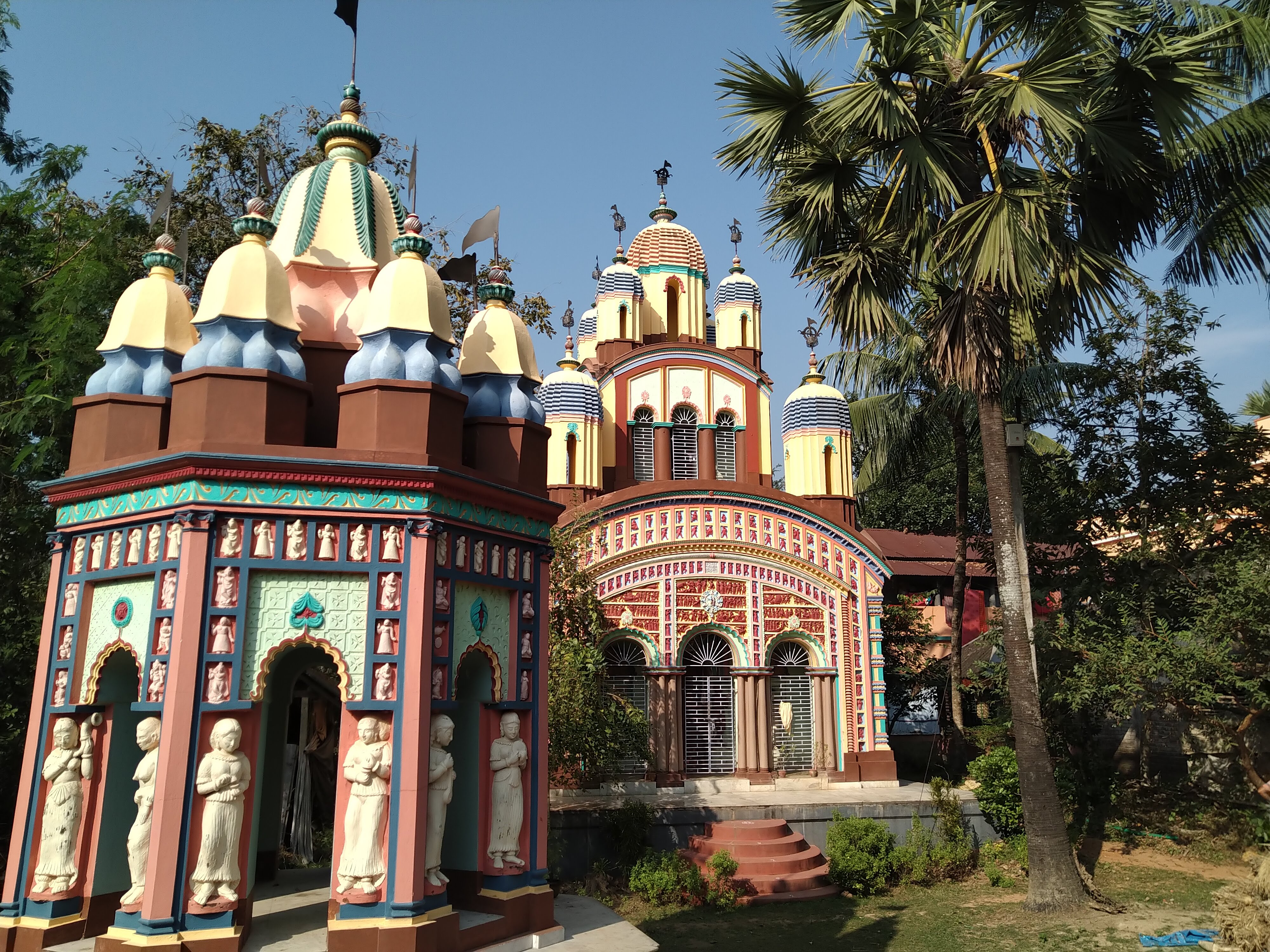
Lakshmi Janardana temple and rasmancha with figurines of musicians

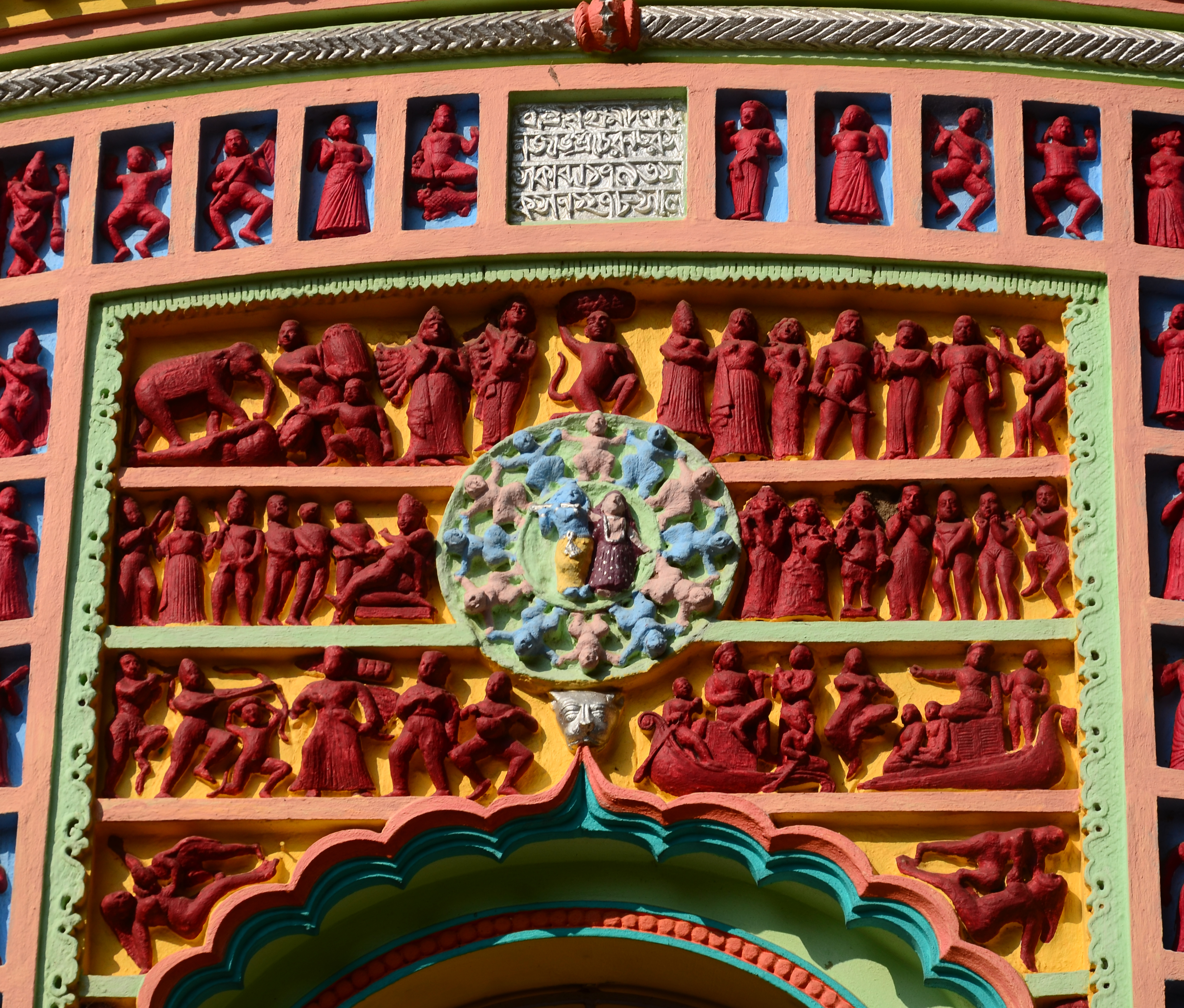
Terracotta relief
