= Joteghanashyam =

- Village
- Location in West Bengal, India Joteghanashyam (India)
- Coordinates: 22°31′10.0″N 87°50′19.2″E
- Country: India
- State: West Bengal
- District: Paschim Medinipur

Population (2011)
  - Total: 15,200

Languages
  - Official: Bengali, English
- Time zone: UTC+5:30 (IST)
- PIN: 721153 (Joteghanashyam)
- Telephone/STD code: 03225
- Lok Sabha constituency: Ghatal
- Vidhan Sabha constituency: Daspur
- Website: paschimmedinipur.gov.in

Joteghanashyam is a village and a gram panchayat in Daspur II CD Block in Ghatal subdivision of Paschim Medinipur district in the state of West Bengal, India.

== Geography ==
There are seven villages under Joteghanashyam Gram Panchayat. They are Joteghanashyam, Satpota, Gourichak, Dongabhanga, Nona-narayanchak, Gomokpota, and Narayanchak.

== Demographics ==
As per 2011 Census of India Joteghanashaym had a total population of 15,200 of which 7,833 (52%) were males and 7,367 (48%) were females. Population below 6 years was 1,616. The total number of literates in Joteghanashyam was 11,851 (77.97% of the population over 6 years).

== Education ==
Joteghanashyam Nilmoni High School is the village's local high school. It was established in 1938.
