= Uttar Bar =

- Village
- Location in West Bengal, India Uttar Bar (India)
- Coordinates: 22.561333°N 87.820083°E
- Country: India
- State: West Bengal
- District: Paschim Medinipur

Population (2011)
  - Total: 5,675

Languages
  - Official: Bengali, English
- Time zone: UTC+5:30 (IST)
- PIN: 721146
- Telephone/STD code: 03225
- Lok Sabha constituency: Ghatal
- Vidhan Sabha constituency: Daspur
- Website: paschimmedinipur.gov.in

Uttar Bar (also spelled Uttar Barh) is a village in the Daspur II CD block in the Ghatal subdivision of the Paschim Medinipur district in the state of West Bengal, India.

== Geography ==
Cities and towns in Ghatal subdivision of Paschim Medinipur district
M: municipal city/ town, R: rural/ urban centre, H: historical/ religious centre
Owing to space constraints in the small map, the actual locations in a larger map may vary slightly

=== Location ===
Uttar Bar is located at 22.561333°N 87.820083°E.

Google maps show the location of Khaputeswari temple a little away at Faridpur.

=== Area overview ===
Ishwar Chandra Vidyasagar, scholar, social reformer and a key figure of the Bengal Renaissance, was born at Birsingha on 26 September 1820.

Ghatal subdivision, shown in the map alongside, has alluvial soils. Around 85% of the total cultivated area is cropped more than once. It has a density of population of 1,099 inhabitants per square kilometre (2,850/sq mi), but being a small subdivision only a little over a fifth of the people in the district reside in this subdivision. 14.33% of the population lives in urban areas and 86.67% lives in the rural areas.

Note: The map alongside presents some of the notable locations in the subdivision. All places marked in the map are linked in the larger full screen map.

== Demographics ==
According to the 2011 Census of India, Uttar Bar had a total population of 5,675, of which 2,880 (51%) were males and 2,795 (49%) were females. There were 630 persons in the age range of 0–6 years. The total number of literate persons in Uttar Bar was 4,392 (87.06% of the population over 6 years).

== Education ==
Kheput High School is a Bengali-medium coeducational institution established in 1860. It has facilities for teaching from class V to class XII. It has a library with 2,600 books, 16 computers and a playground.

== Uttar Bar picture gallery ==
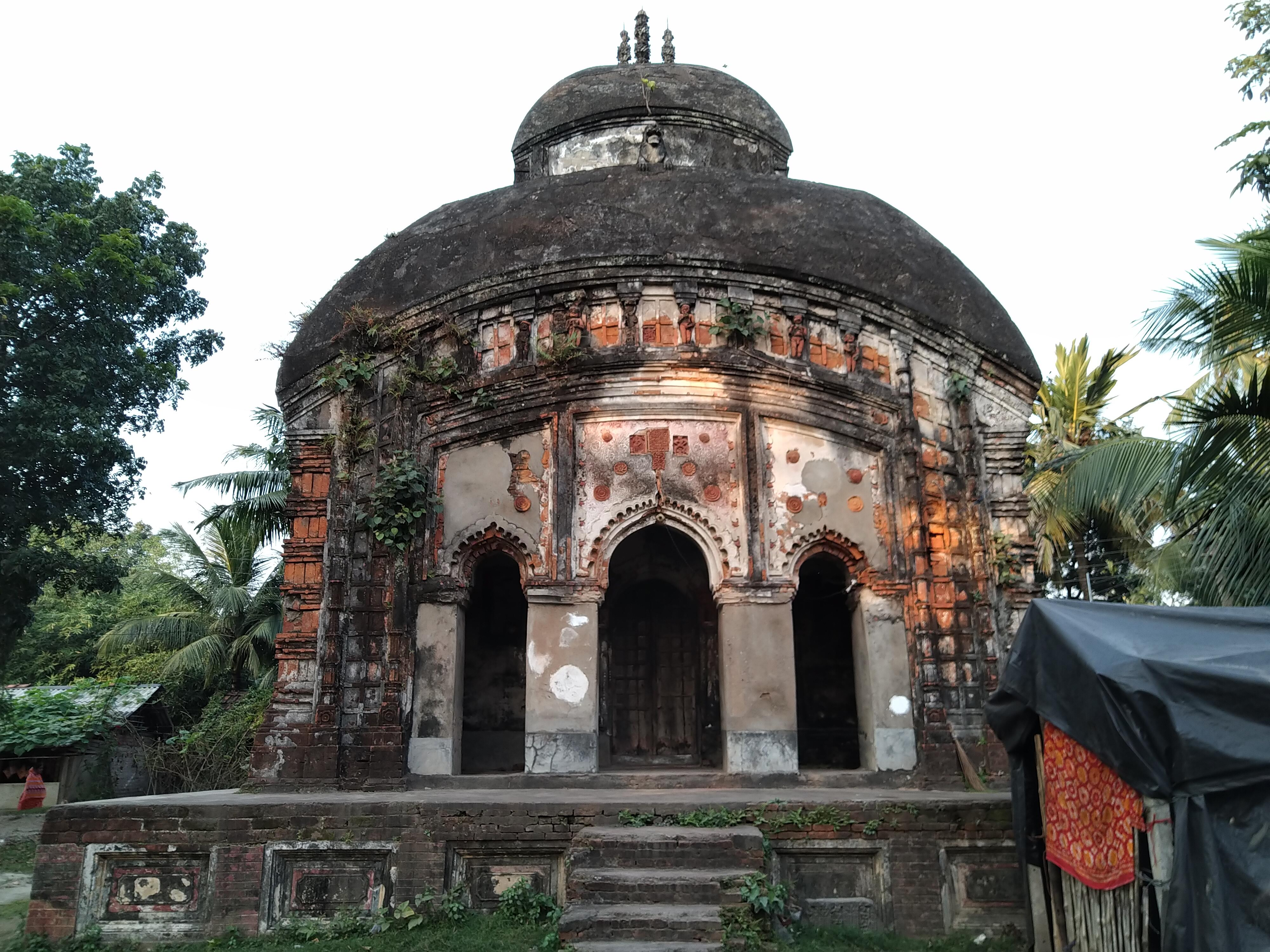
At-chala Kheputeswari temple

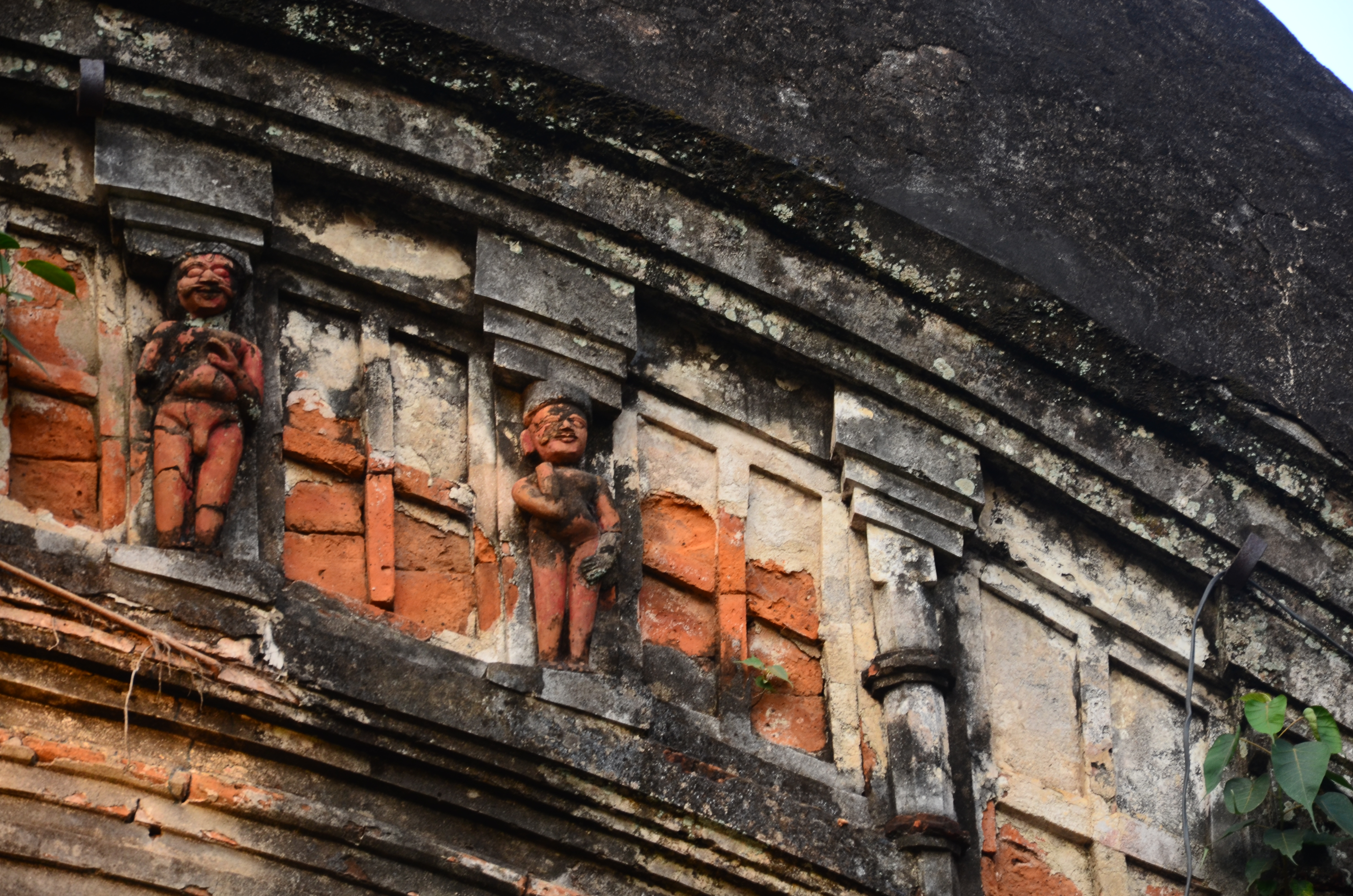
Terracotta work

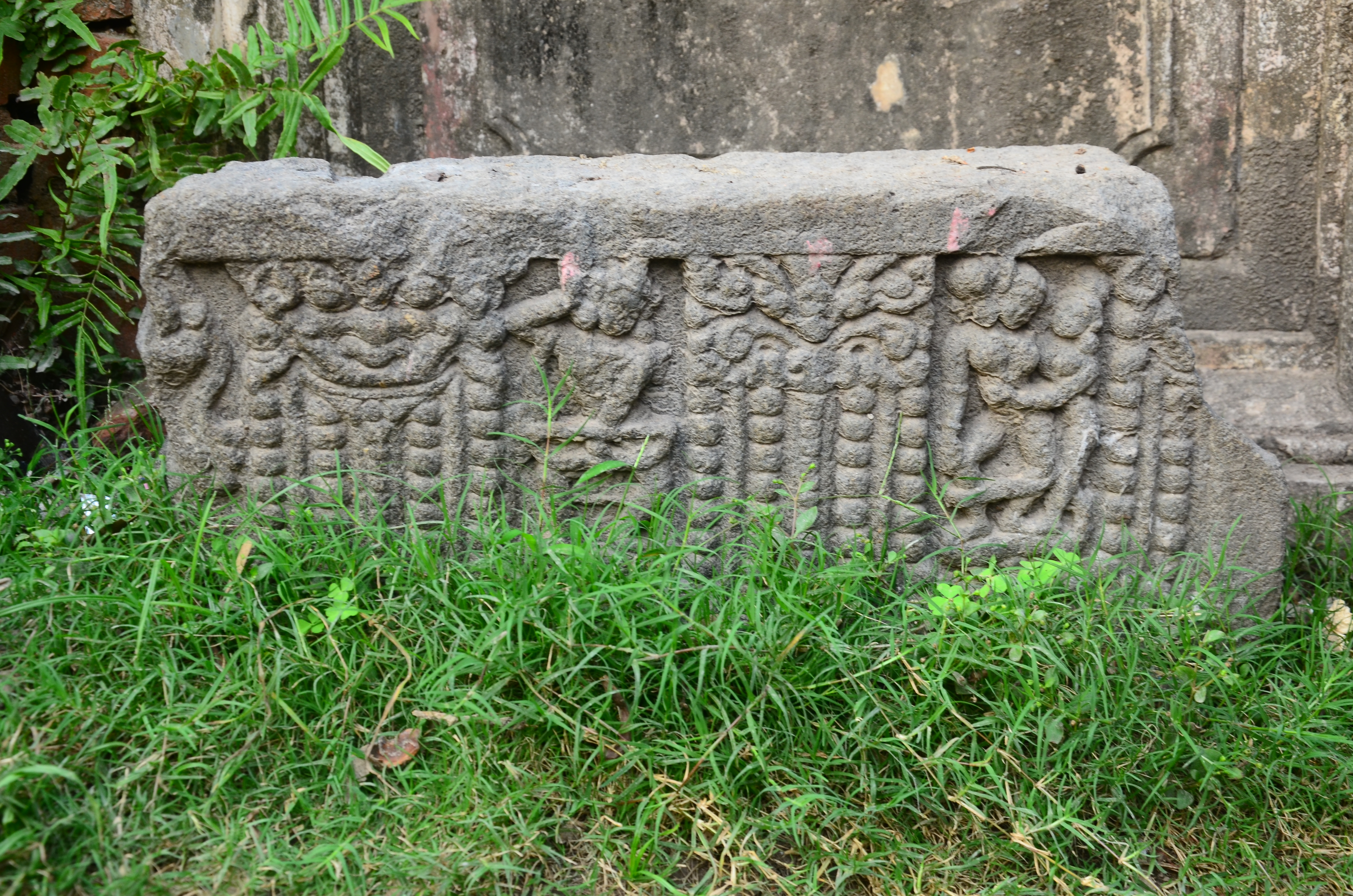
Decorated stone pillar in front of the temple
