= Chaipat =

- Village
- Location in West Bengal, India Chaipat (India)
- Coordinates: 22°34′09.6″N 87°48′17.3″E
- Country: India
- State: West Bengal
- District: Paschim Medinipur

Languages
  - Official: Bengali, English
- Time zone: UTC+5:30 (IST)
- PIN: 721148
- Telephone/STD code: 03225
- Lok Sabha constituency: Ghatal
- Vidhan Sabha constituency: Daspur
- Website: paschimmedinipur.gov.in

Chaipat is a village, in Daspur II CD Block in Ghatal subdivision of Paschim Medinipur district in the state of West Bengal, India.

== Geography ==
Cities and towns in Ghatal subdivision of Paschim Medinipur district
M: municipal city/ town, R: rural/ urban centre, H: historical/ religious centre
Owing to space constraints in the small map, the actual locations in a larger map may vary slightly

=== Location ===
Chaipat is located at 22°34′09.6″N 87°48′17.3″E.

=== Area overview ===
Ishwar Chandra Vidyasagar, scholar, social reformer and a key figure of the Bengal Renaissance, was born at Birsingha on 26 September 1820.

Ghatal subdivision, shown in the map alongside, has alluvial soils. Around 85% of the total cultivated area is cropped more than once. It has a density of population of 1,099 per km^{2}, but being a small subdivision only a little over a fifth of the people in the district reside in this subdivision. 14.33% of the population lives in urban areas and 86.67% lives in the rural areas.

Note: The map alongside presents some of the notable locations in the subdivision. All places marked in the map are linked in the larger full screen map.

== Demographics ==
As per 2011 Census of India Chanipat had a total population of 16,345 of which 8,022 (49%) were males and 8,323 (51%) were females. Population below 6 years was 1,750. The total number of literates in Chanipat was 12,284 (75.15% of the population over 6 years).

== Transport and Popular Places ==
Kriya Yoga ashram at Chaipat satmatha, rajrajeswar Temple, Badur Bagan, Shiv-Sitala Temple. Chaipat is on the Gopiganj-Sultannagar Road. Sultannagar is on SH 4.

== Education ==
Chaipat Saheed Pradyot Bhattacharya Mahavidyalaya, established in 2007, is affiliated to Vidyasagar University. It offers honours courses in Bengali, English, Sanskrit and History.

Chaipat High school was established in 1910, in British India .

== Chaipat picture gallery ==
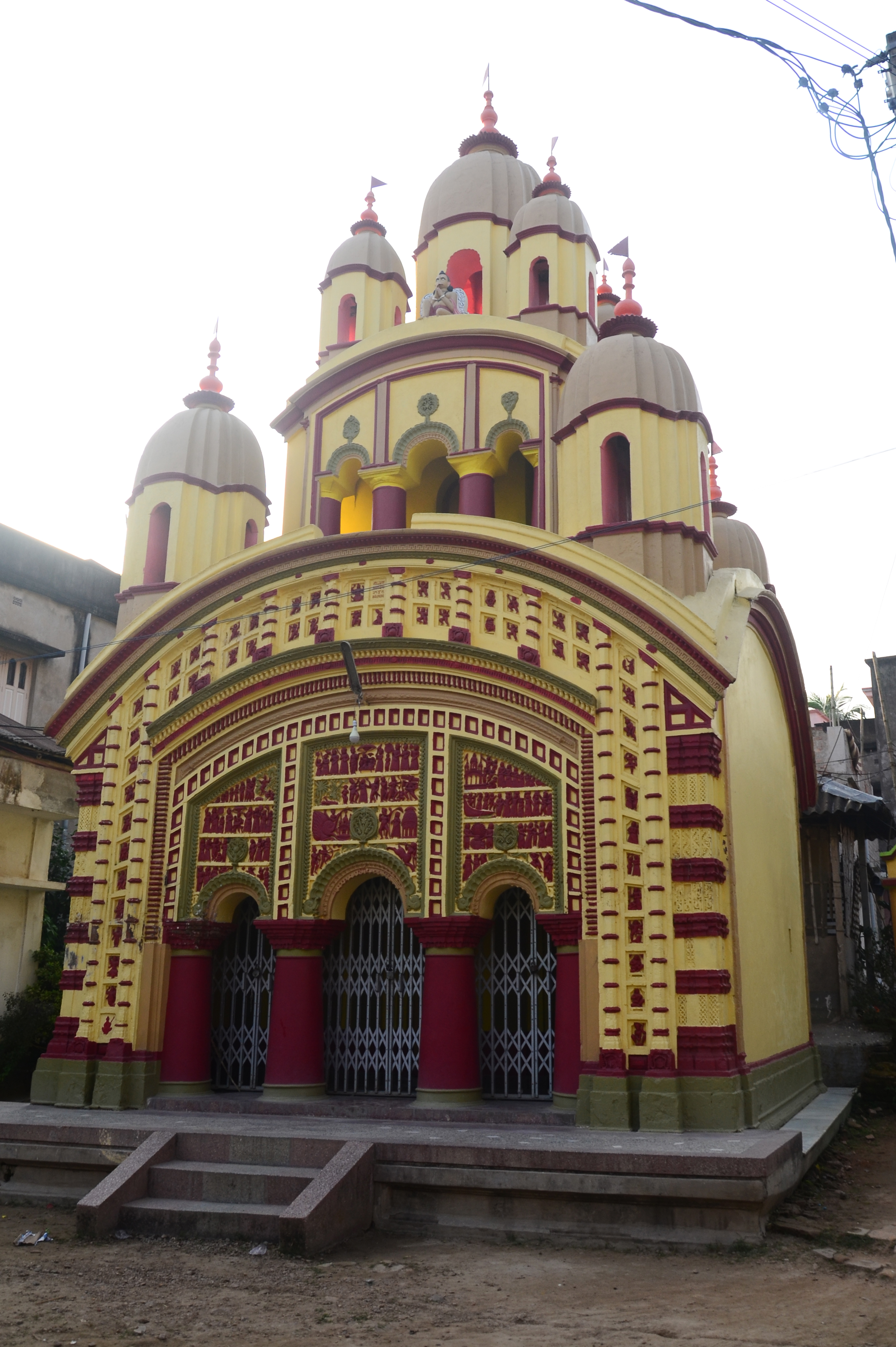
Nava-ratna Rajrajesvara temple

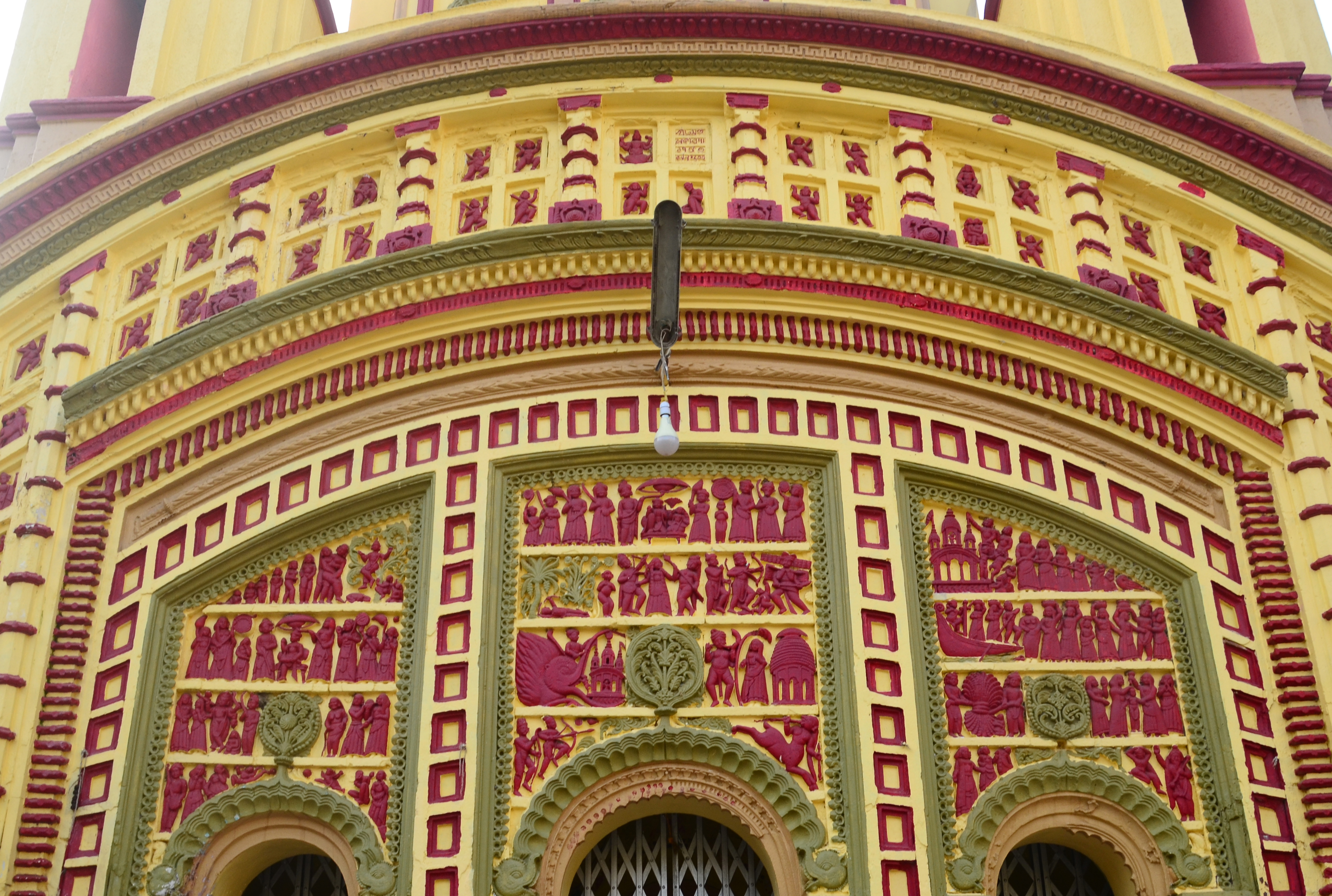
Terracotta relief

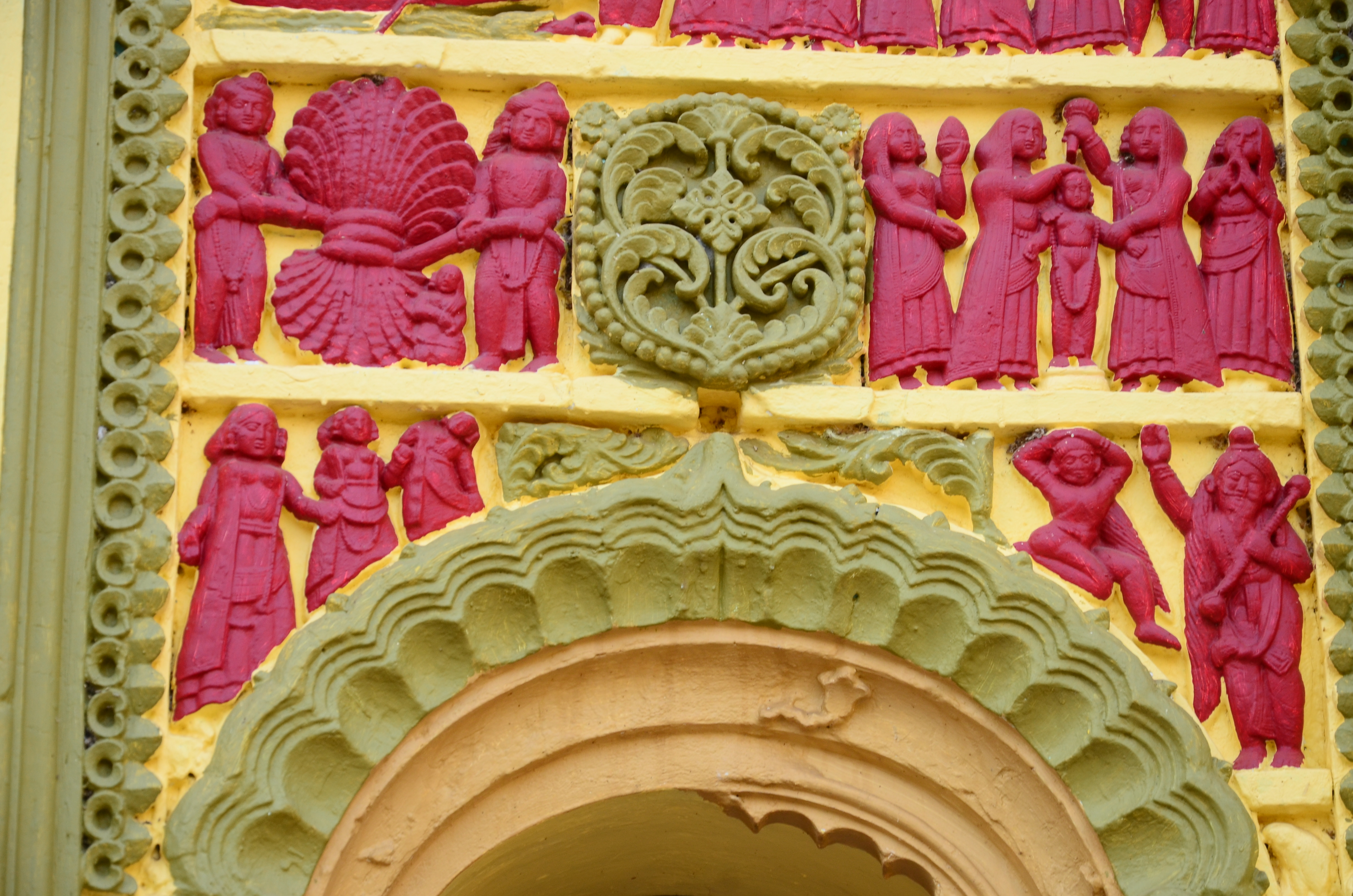
Terracotta relief
