= Daspur II =

Daspur - II
- Community development block
- Interactive map of Daspur - II
- Coordinates: 22.605°N 87.722°E
- Country: India
- State: West Bengal
- District: Paschim Medinipur
- Founded by: Government of West Bengal

Government
  - Type: Federal Democracy

Area
  - Total: 165.45 km^{2} (63.88 sq mi)
- Elevation: 9 m (30 ft)

Population (2011)
  - Total: 238,529
  - Density: 1,441.7/km^{2} (3,734.0/sq mi)

Languages
  - Official: Bengali, English
- Time zone: UTC+5:30 (IST)
- PIN: 721148 (Kheput); 721641 (Khukurdaha); 721153 (Joteghanashyam); 721170 (Sonakhali) 721212 (Kamalpur); 721148(Gochhati)
- Area code: 03225
- ISO 3166 code: IN-WB
- Vehicle registration: WB-34
- Literacy: 85.62%
- Lok Sabha constituency: Ghatal
- Vidhan Sabha constituency: Daspur
- Website: paschimmedinipur.gov.in

Daspur II is a community development block that forms an administrative division in Ghatal subdivision of Paschim Medinipur district in the Indian state of West Bengal.

== Geography ==
In Daspur II CD block, the area is a flat deltaic country intersected by numerous rivers and water courses. It is a flood prone area and is affected by water logging in the rainy season. 100% of the cultivated area has highly productive alluvial soil.

Daspur is located at 22°36′18″N 87°43′19″E.

Daspur II CD block is bounded by Khanakul I CD block, in Hooghly district, in the north, Khanakul II CD block, in Hooghly district, in the east, Panskura CD block, in Purba Medinipur district, in the south and Daspur I CD block in the west.

It is located 58 km from Midnapore, the district headquarters.

Daspur II CD block has an area of 165.45 km^{2}. It has 1 panchayat samity, 14 gram panchayats, 161 gram sansads (village councils), 162 mouzas and 157 inhabited villages. Daspur police station serves this block. Headquarters of this CD block is at Sonakhali.

Gram panchayats of Daspur II block/ panchayat samiti are: Benai, Chaipat, Dudkomra, Gochhati, Goura, Jotighanashyam, Kamalpur, Khanjapur, Kheput, Khukurdaha, Nishchintapur, Palashpai, Ranichak and Sahachak.

== Demographics ==
=== Population ===
According to the 2011 Census of India Daspur II CD block had a total population of 238,529, all of which were rural. There were 121,742 (51%) males and 116,787 (49%) females. Population in the age range 0–6 years was 25,518. Scheduled Castes numbered 29,922 (12.54%) and Scheduled Tribes numbered 585 (0.25%).

As per 2001 census, Daspur II block had a total population of 206,064, out of which 100,700 were males and 105,364 were females. Daspur II block registered a population growth of 4.87 per cent during the 1991-2001 decade. Decadal growth for the combined Midnapore district was 14.87 per cent. Decadal growth in West Bengal was 17.45 per cent.

Large villages (with 4,000+ population) in Daspur II CD block are (2011 census figures in brackets): Goura (4,899), Khukur Daha (4,110), Palashpai (4,800), Guchhati (4,395), Bhuta (5,022), Khanjapur (4,352), Kamalpur (4,124), Jot Kanusamgar (6,940), Ranichak (7,408), Chaipat (16,345), Kaijuri (4,454), Benai (5,731), Uttar Bar (5,675), Nischintapur (6,698), Sitapur (4,250), Jot Ghanashyam (15,200), Kultikri (6,607) and Maguria (5,128).

Other villages in Daspur II CD block included (2011 census figures in brackets): Sahachak (2,302), Dudhkonara (3,746) and Ajuria (1,811).

=== Literacy ===
As per the 2011 census the total number of literate persons in Daspur II CD block was 182,378 (85.62% of the population over 6 years) out of which males numbered 99,472 (91.59% of the male population over 6 years) and females numbered 82,906 (79.41% of the female population over 6 years). The gender gap in literacy rates was 12.18%.

See also – List of West Bengal districts ranked by literacy rate

Literacy in CD blocks of
Paschim Medinipur district
Jhargram subdivision
Binpur I – 69.74%
Binpur II – 70.46%
Gopiballavpur I – 65.44%
Gopiballavpur II – 71.40%
Jamboni – 72.63%
Jhargram – 72.23%
Nayagram – 63.70%
Sankrail – 73.35%
Medinipur Sadar subdivision
Garhbeta I – 72.21%
Garhbeta II – 75.87%
Garhbeta III – 73.42%
Keshpur – 77.88%
Midnapore Sadar – 70.48%
Salboni – 74.87%
Ghatal subdivision
Chandrakona I – 78.93%
Chandrakona II – 75.96%
Daspur I – 83.99%
Daspur II – 85.62%
Ghatal – 81.08%
Kharagpur subdivision
Dantan I – 73.53%
Dantan II – 82.45%
Debra – 82.03%
Keshiari – 76.78%
Kharagpur I – 77.06%
Kharagpur II – 76.08%
Mohanpur – 80.51%
Narayangarh – 78.31%
Pingla – 83.57%
Sabang – 86.84%
2011 Census: CD Block Wise

Primary Census Abstract Data

=== Language and religion ===
Religion in Daspur II CD block (2011)
Hinduism	92.80%
Islam	7.04%
Other or not stated	0.16%

In the 2011 census Hindus numbered 221,349 and formed 92.80% of the population in Daspur II CD block. Muslims numbered 16,794 and formed 7.04% of the population. Others numbered 386 and formed 0.16% of the population. Others include Addi Bassi, Marang Boro, Santal, Saranath, Sari Dharma, Sarna, Alchchi, Bidin, Sant, Saevdharm, Seran, Saran, Sarin, Kheria. Christians and other religious communities. In 2001, Hindus were 93.47% and Muslims 6.49% of the population respectively.

Bengali is the predominant language, spoken by 99.86% of the population.

== BPL families ==
In Daspur II CD block 20.29% families were living below poverty line in 2007.

According to the District Human Development Report of Paschim Medinipur: The 29 CD blocks of the district were classified into four categories based on the poverty ratio. Nayagram, Binpur II and Jamboni CD blocks have very high poverty levels (above 60%). Kharagpur I, Kharagpur II, Sankrail, Garhbeta II, Pingla and Mohanpur CD blocks have high levels of poverty (50-60%), Jhargram, Midnapore Sadar, Dantan I, Gopiballavpur II, Binpur I, Dantan II, Keshiari, Chandrakona I, Gopiballavpur I, Chandrakona II, Narayangarh, Keshpur, Ghatal, Sabang, Garhbeta I, Salboni, Debra and Garhbeta III CD blocks have moderate levels of poverty (25-50%) and Daspur II and Daspur I CD blocks have low levels of poverty (below 25%).

== Economy ==
=== Infrastructure ===
86 or 100% of mouzas in Daspur II CD block were electrified by 31 March 2014.

86 mouzas in Daspur II CD block had drinking water facilities in 2013-14. There were 51 fertiliser depots, 21 seed stores and 86 fair price shops in the CD block.

=== Agriculture ===
Persons engaged in agriculture
in Daspur II CD block
1. Bargadars (3.82%)
2. Patta holders (2.94%)
3. Small farmers (2.18%)
4. Marginal farmers (60.4%)
5. Agricultural labourers (30.6%)

Although the Bargadari Act of 1950 recognised the rights of bargadars to a higher share of crops from the land that they tilled, it was not fully implemented. Large tracts, beyond the prescribed limit of land ceiling, remained with the rich landlords. From 1977 onwards major land reforms took place in West Bengal. Land in excess of land ceiling was acquired and distributed amongst the peasants. Following land reforms land ownership pattern has undergone transformation. In 2013-14, persons engaged in agriculture in Daspur II CD block could be classified as follows: bargadars 3.82%, patta (document) holders 2.94%, small farmers (possessing land between 1 and 2 hectares) 2.18%, marginal farmers (possessing land up to 1 hectare) 60.42% and agricultural labourers 30.64%.

In 2005-06 the nett cropped area in Daspur II CD block was 13,000 hectares, out of a geographical area of 16,614 hectares, and the area in which more than one crop was grown was 12,127 hectares.

The extension of irrigation has played a role in growth of the predominantly agricultural economy. In 2013-14, the total area irrigated in Daspur II CD block was 8,933 hectares, out of which 5,800 hectares was irrigated by canal water, 250 hectares by tank water, 2,260 hectares by deep tubewells and 623 hectares by river lift irrigation.

In 2013-14, Daspur II CD block produced 631 tonnes of Aman paddy, the main winter crop, from 2,487 hectares, 19,273 tonnes of Boro paddy (spring crop) from 7,019 hectares, 7,443 tonnes of jute from 507 hectares and 5,195 tonnes of potatoes from 280 hectares. It also produced pulses and oilseeds.

=== Banking ===
In 2013-14, Daspur II CD block had offices of 7 commercial banks and 3 gramin banks.

== Transport ==
Daspur II CD block has 6 ferry services and 3 originating/ terminating bus routes. The nearest railway station is 25 km from the CD block headquarters.

== Education ==
In 2013-14, Daspur II CD block had 162 primary schools with 11,504 students, 1 middle schools with 64 students, 21 high schools with 13,120 students and 14 higher secondary schools with 13,446 students. Daspur II CD block had 1 general college with 277 students and 321 institutions for special and non-formal education with 10,503 students.

The United Nations Development Programme considers the combined primary and secondary enrolment ratio as the simple indicator of educational achievement of the children in the school going age. The infrastructure available is important. In Daspur II CD block out of the total 162 primary schools in 2008-2009, 59 had pucca buildings, 70 partially pucca, 1 kucha and 32 multiple type.

Chaipat Saheed Pradyot Bhattacharya Mahavidyalaya at Chaipat was established in 2007 and is affiliated to Vidyasagar University. It offers honours courses in Bengali, English, Sanskrit and history.

== Culture ==
The Daspur II CD block has several heritage temples.

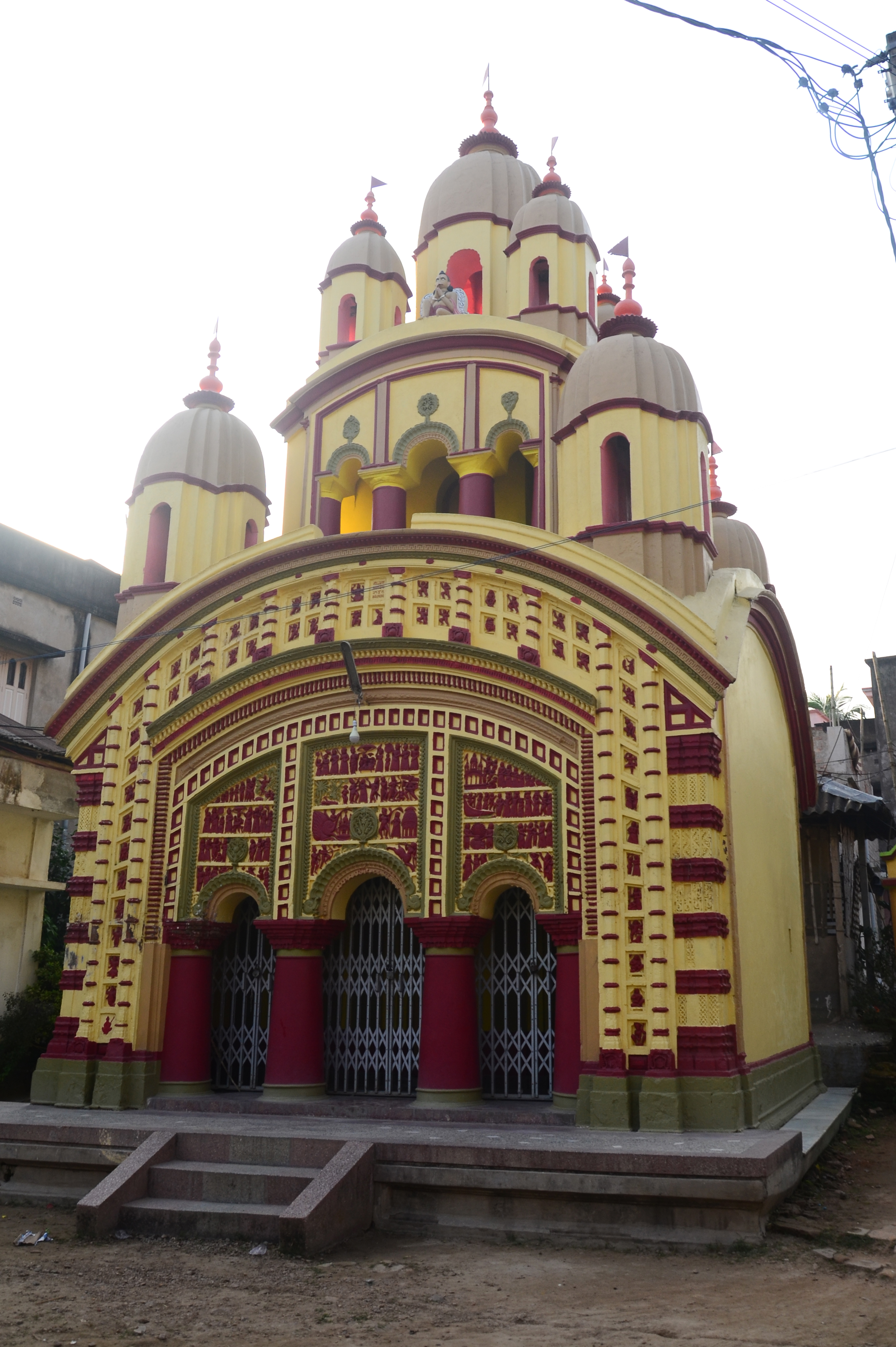
Chaipat: Nava ratna Rajrajesvara temple, built in 1828 with rich terracotta façade, renovated

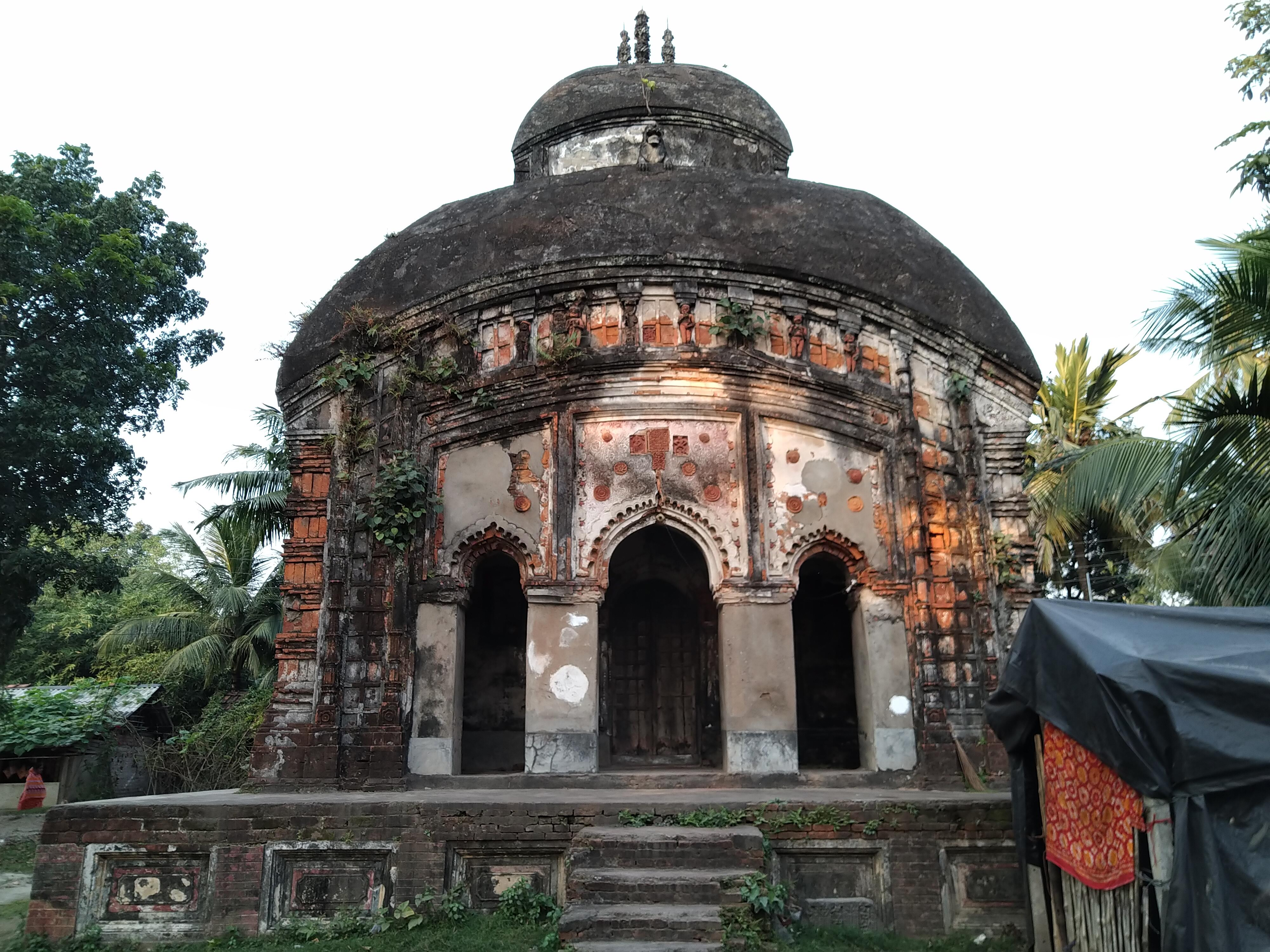
Uttar Bar: At chala Kheputeswari temple at Kheput, with some decoration

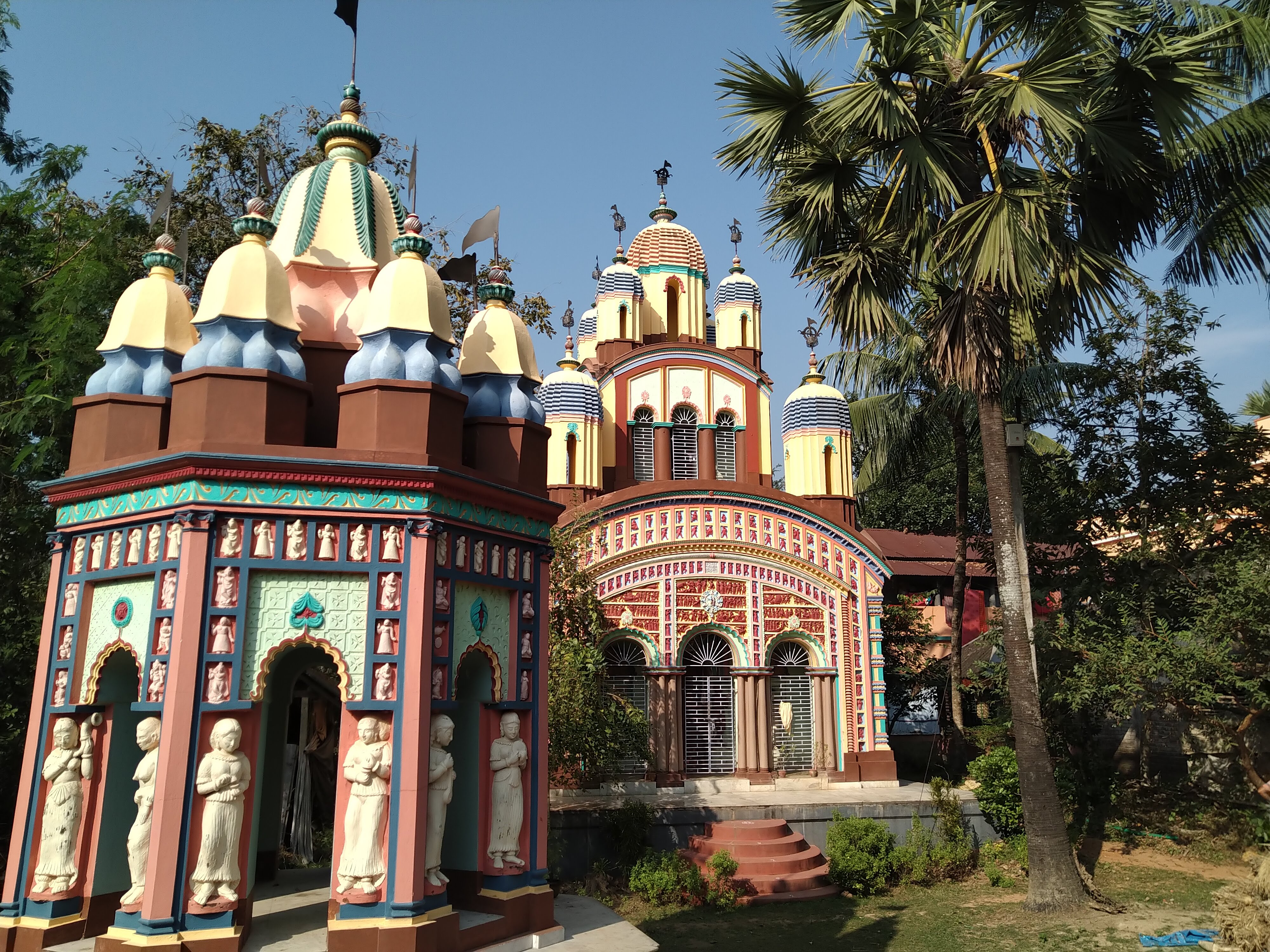
Ajuria: Nava ratna Lakshmi Janardana temple with rasmancha, built in 1793, renovated

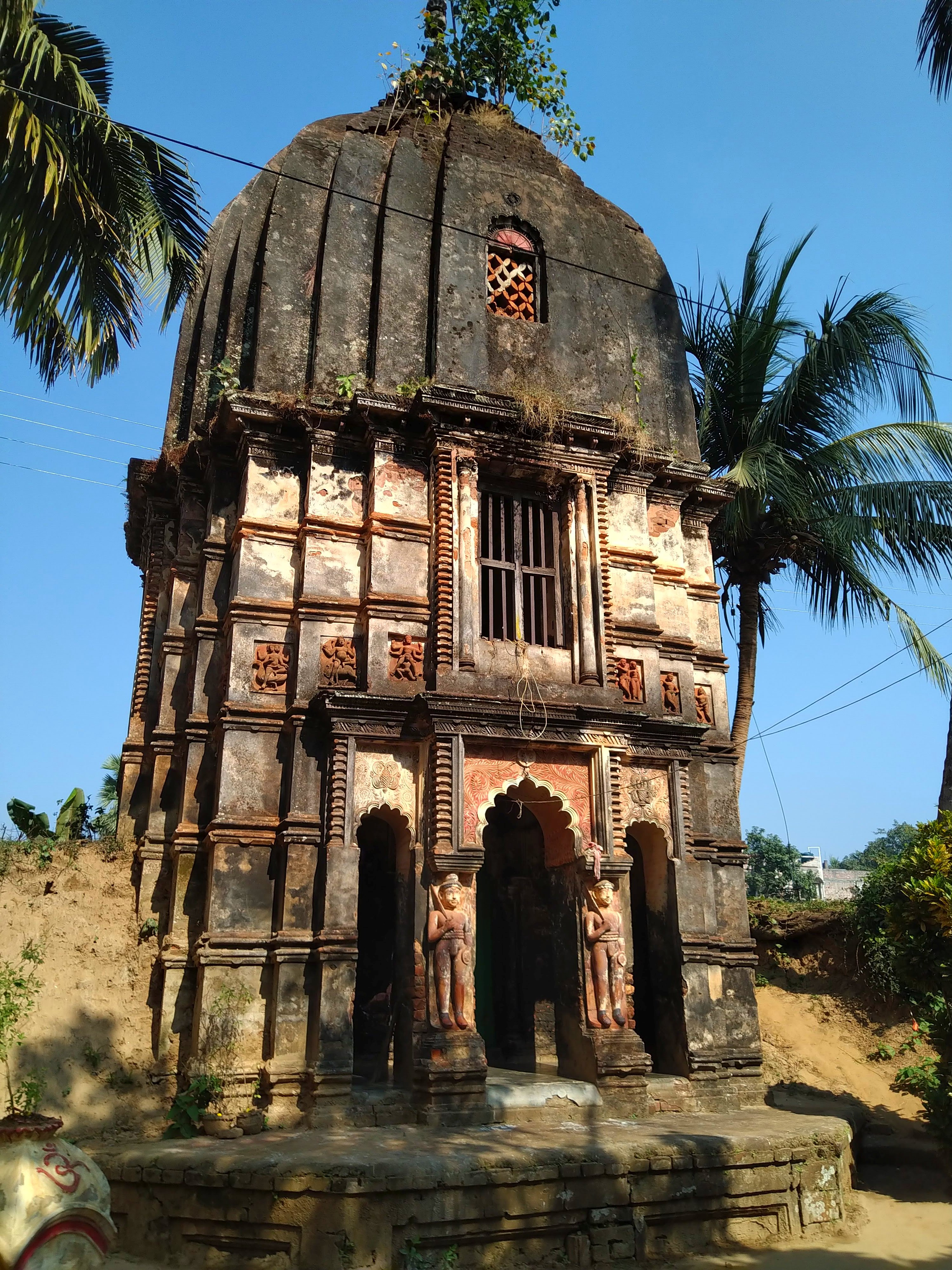
Palashpai: Sridhaji deul, built in 1834.

== Healthcare ==
In 2014, Daspur II CD block had 1 rural hospital, 3 primary health centres and 3 private nursing homes with total 100 beds and 6 doctors. It had 34 family welfare sub centres and 1 family welfare centre. 2,568 patients were treated indoor and 77,737 patients were treated outdoor in the hospitals, health centres and subcentres of the CD block.

Sonakhali Rural Hospital, with 30 beds at Sonakhali, is the major government medical facility in the Daspur II CD block. There are primary health centres at: Khukurda (with 10 beds), Nischintapur (with 6 beds) and Chaipat (with 6 beds).
