= Daspur =

- Village
- Location in West Bengal, India Daspur (India)
- Coordinates: 22°36′28.8″N 87°43′30.0″E
- Country: India
- State: West Bengal
- District: Paschim Medinipur

Population (2011)
  - Total: 3,667

Languages
  - Official: Bengali, English
- Time zone: UTC+5:30 (IST)
- Telephone/STD code: 03225
- Lok Sabha constituency: Ghatal
- Vidhan Sabha constituency: Daspur
- Website: paschimmedinipur.gov.in

Daspur is a village, with a police station, in Daspur I CD Block in Ghatal subdivision of Paschim Medinipur district in the state of West Bengal, India. Previously a part of Hooghly District, later in 1872 it was merged with Medinipur district.

== History ==
Daspur is a very old establishment. British made their barrack in this area in the early 17th century. Earlier it was part of Hooghly District later in 1872 it was merged with Medinipur district.

== Geography ==
Cities and towns in Ghatal subdivision of Paschim Medinipur district
M: municipal city/ town, R: rural/ urban centre, H: historical/ religious centre
Owing to space constraints in the small map, the actual locations in a larger map may vary slightly

=== Location ===
Daspur is located at 22°36′28.8″N 87°43′30.0″E.

=== Area overview ===
Ishwar Chandra Vidyasagar, scholar, social reformer and a key figure of the Bengal Renaissance, was born at Birsingha on 26 September 1820.

Ghatal subdivision, shown in the map alongside, has alluvial soils. Around 85% of the total cultivated area is cropped more than once. It has a density of population of 1,099 per km^{2}, but being a small subdivision only a little over a fifth of the people in the district reside in this subdivision. 14.33% of the population lives in urban areas and 86.67% lives in the rural areas.

Note: The map alongside presents some of the notable locations in the subdivision. All places marked in the map are linked in the larger full screen map.

== Demographics ==
As per 2011 Census of India Daspur had a total population of 3,667 of which 1,878 (51%) were males and 1,789 (49%) were females. Population below 6 years was 435. The total number of literates in Daspur was 2,957 (80.64% of the population over 6 years).

== Civic administration ==
=== CD block HQ ===
The headquarters of Daspur I block are located at Daspur.

=== Police station ===
Daspur police station has jurisdiction over Daspur I and Daspur II CD blocks.

== Culture ==
David J. McCutchion mentions the following temples in Daspur town:

- The Gopinatha temple as an ek-ratna with a ridged rekha tower of the smaller Bishunupur type with single porch, brick-built in 1716, measuring around 21’ square, having rich terracotta façade.
- The Shyama-Raya temple as an ek-ratna with smooth rekha tower of the smaller Daspur type generally with the tower displaced to the back, measuring around 24’ square, built in 1699. The ruinous tower seemed to have been at the corner.
- The Lakshmi-Janardana temple of the Pal family as a pancha-ratna with smooth rekha turrets and porch on three arches. Measuring around 18’ square, it was built in 1847 and richly terra-cotta decorated.
- The abandoned temple of the Chakravarti (Choudhurimayum) family, also in the same category as the Lakshmi-Janardana temple, measuring around 17’ 8” square, built in 1847and richly terracotta decorated.

The Gopinatha temple is a state protected monument.

== Daspur (town) picture gallery ==
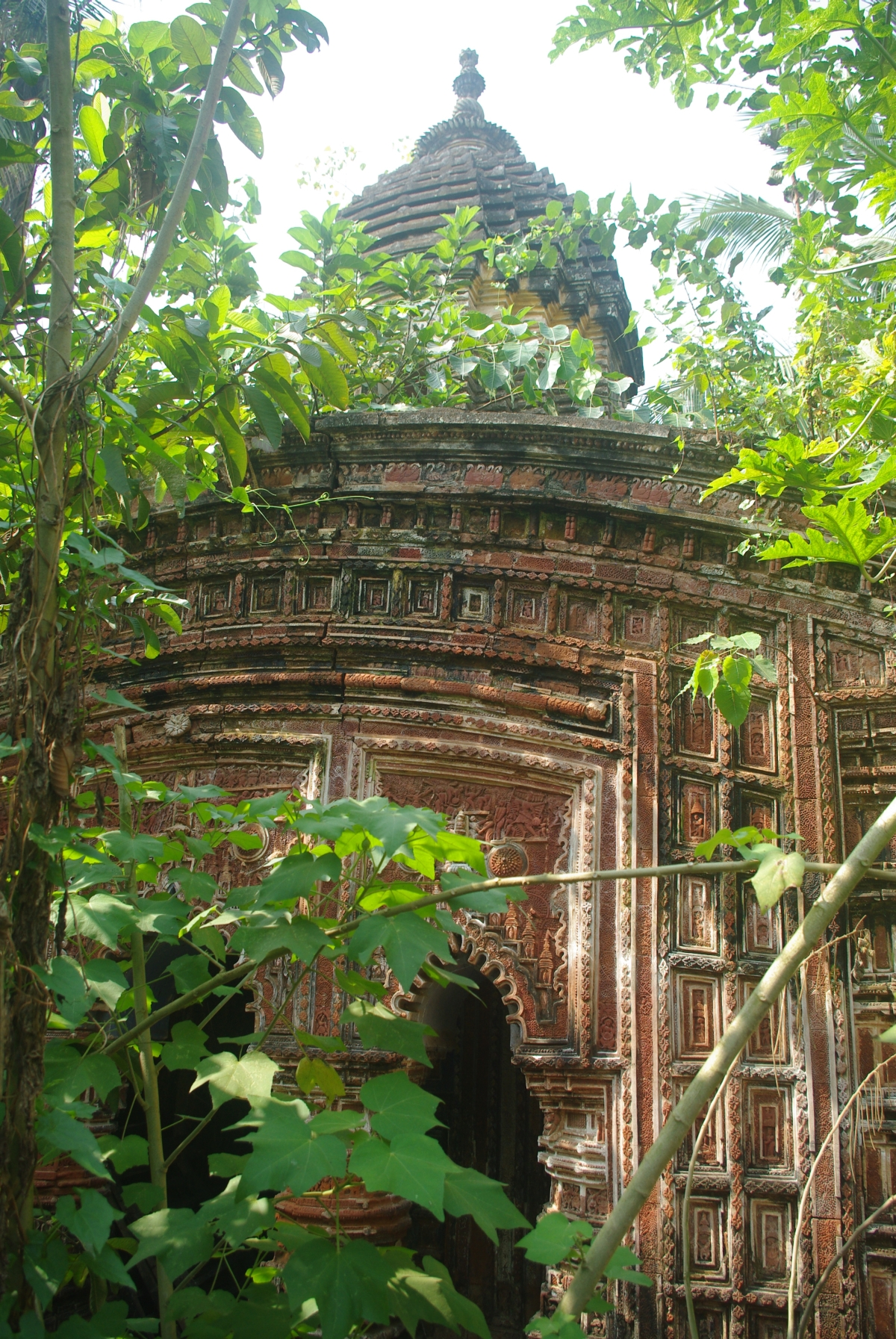
Gopinatha temple

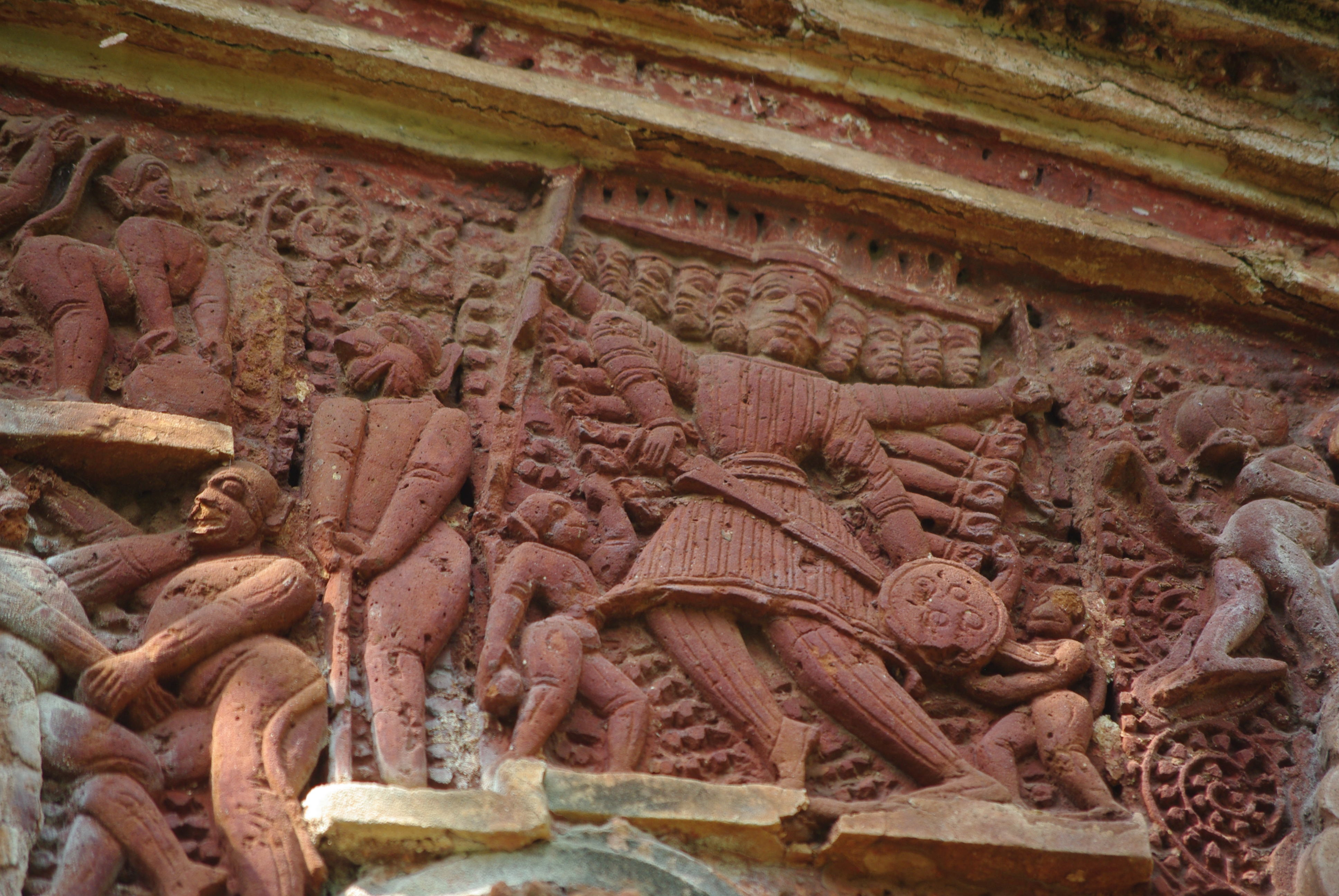
Terrcotta panel at Gopinatha temple

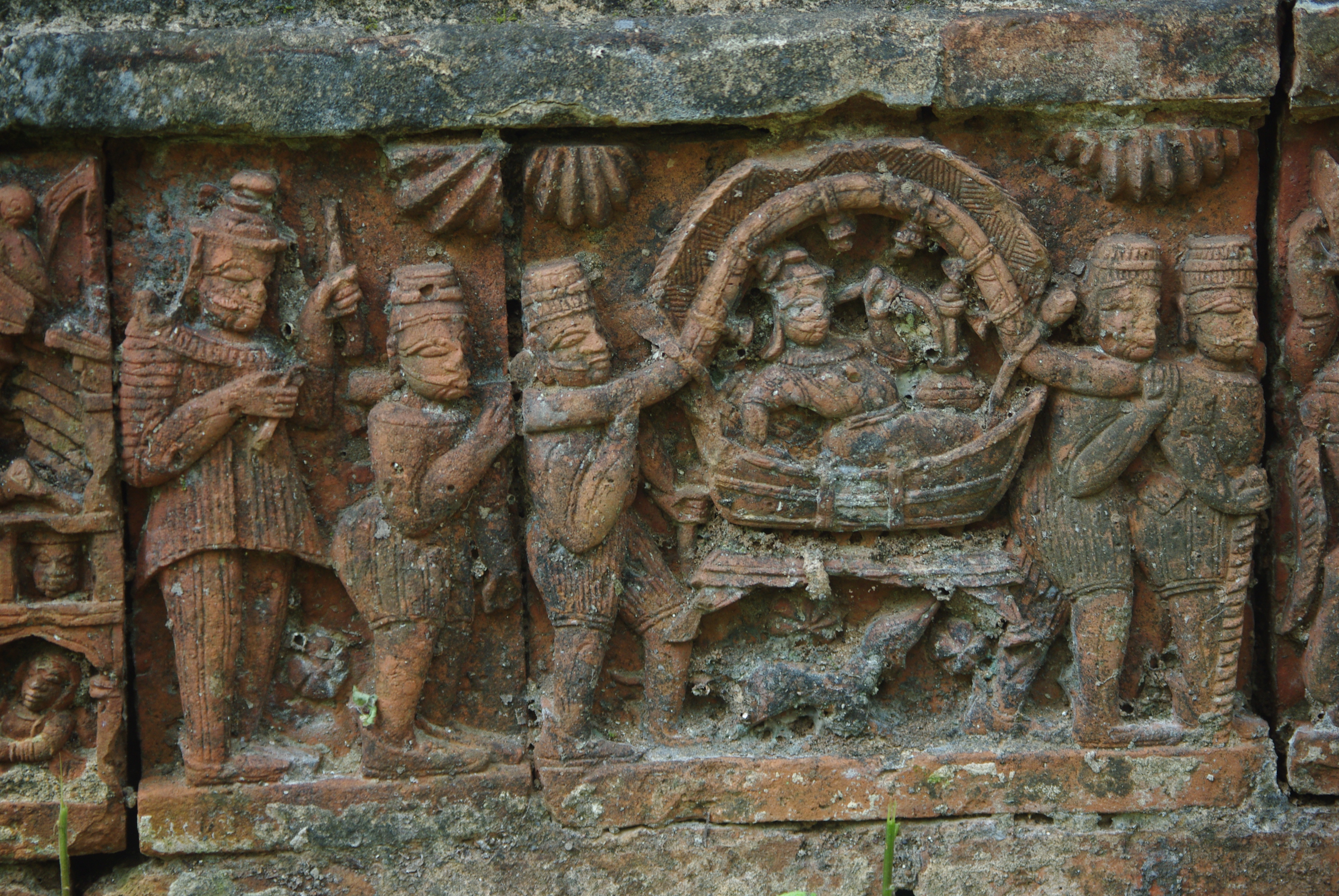
Terracotta panel at Gopinatha temple

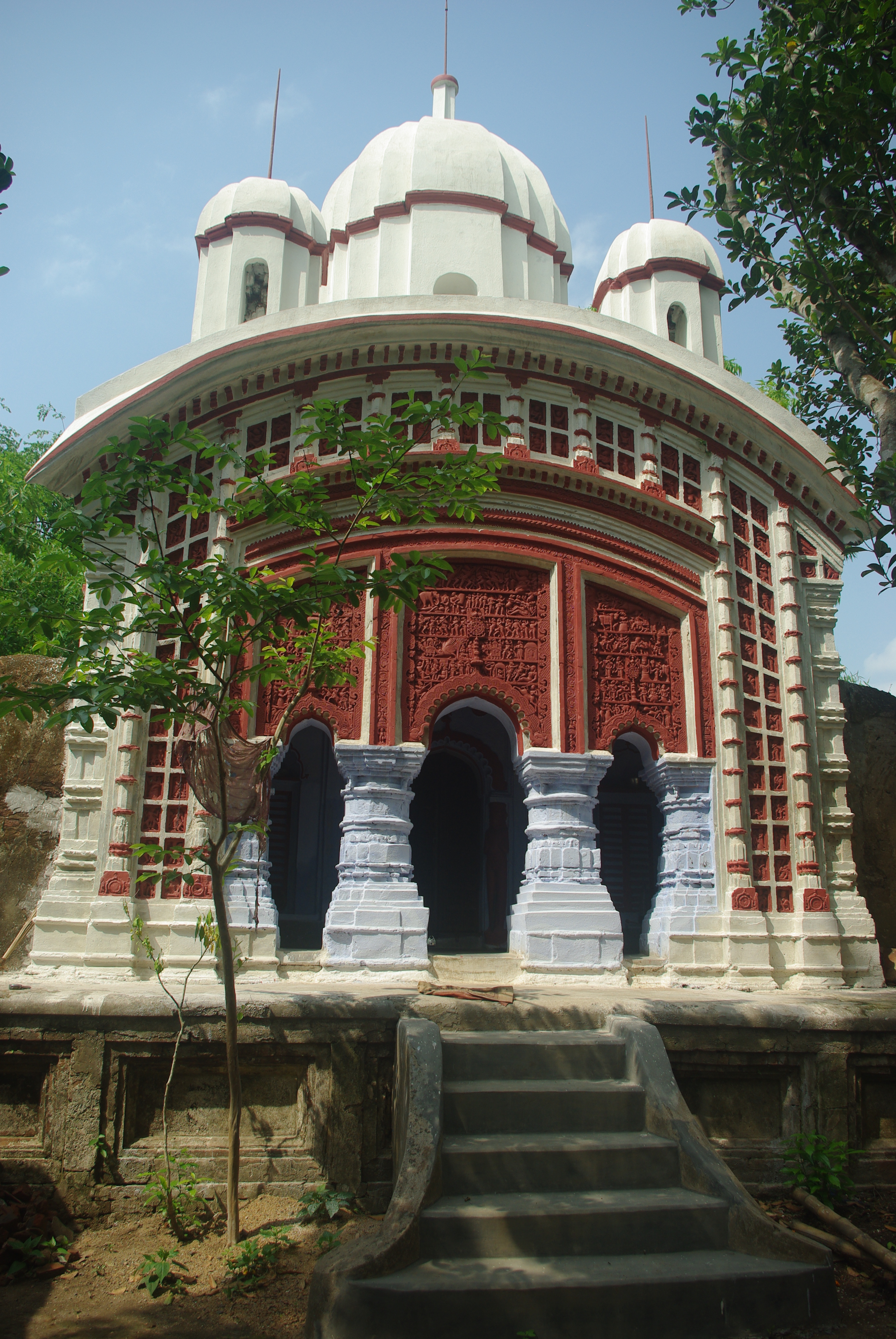
Lakshmi-Janardana temple

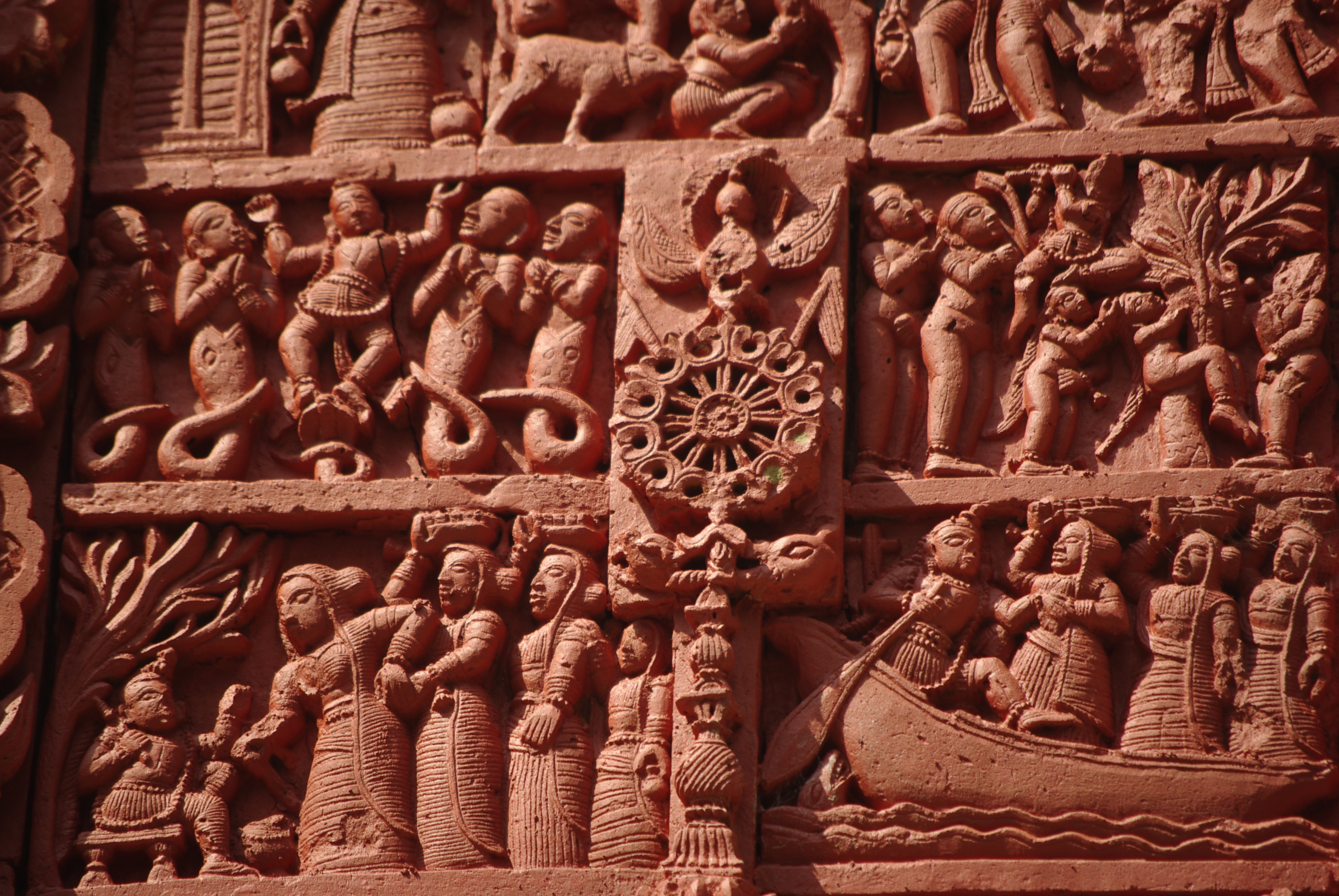
Terracotta panel at Lakshmi-Janardana temple

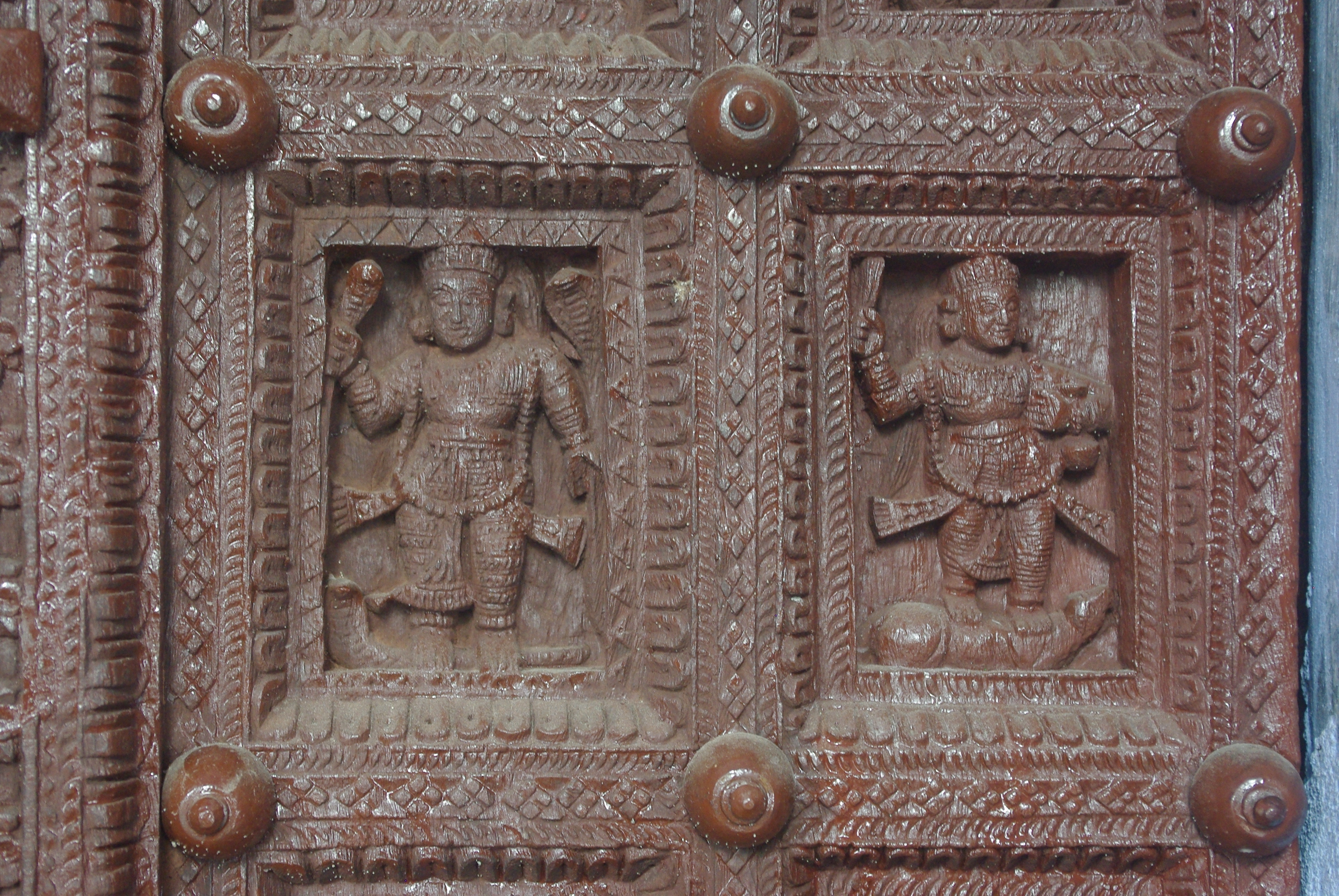
Carvings on the wooden door at Lakshmi-Janardana temple

== Transport ==
State Highway 4 running from Jhalda (in Purulia district) to Digha (in Purba Medinipur district) passes through Daspur.

== Healthcare ==
Daspur Rural Hospital, with 30 beds at Daspur is the major government medical facility in the Daspur I CD block.
