= Chandrakona I =

- Community development block
- Coordinates: 22°43′48.0″N 87°34′48.0″E
- Country: India
- State: West Bengal
- District: Paschim Medinipur

Government
  - Type: Federal democracy

Area
  - Total: 193.54 km^{2} (74.73 sq mi)
- Elevation: 16 m (52 ft)

Population (2011)
  - Total: 136,006
  - Density: 702.73/km^{2} (1,820.1/sq mi)

Languages
  - Official: Bengali, English
- Time zone: UTC+5:30 (IST)
- PIN: 721201 (Chandrakona); 721232 (Manoharpur)
- Area code: 03225
- Vehicle registration: WB-34
- Literacy: 78.93%
- Lok Sabha constituency: Arambagh
- Vidhan Sabha constituency: Chandrakona
- Website: paschimmedinipur.gov.in

Chandrakona I is a community development block that forms an administrative division in Ghatal subdivision of Paschim Medinipur district in the Indian state of West Bengal.

== Geography ==
In Chandrakona I CD block is a flat deltaic country intersected by numerous rivers and water courses. 100% of the cultivated area has highly productive alluvial soil.

Chandrakona is located at 22°44′N 87°31′E.

Chandrakona I CD block is bounded by Goghat I and Goghat II CD blocks, in Hooghly district, in the north, Ghatal CD block in the east, Daspur I CD block in the south and Chandrakona II and Garhbeta I CD blocks in the west.

It is located 53 km from Midnapore, the district headquarters.

Chandrakona I CD block has an area of 193.54 km^{2}. It has 1 panchayat samity, 6 gram panchayats, 102 gram sansads (village councils), 132 mouzas and 126 inhabited villages. Chandrakona police station serves this block. Headquarters of this CD block is at Bamaria, Kshirpai.

Gram panchayats of Chandrakona I block/ panchayat samiti are: Jara, Laxmipur, Mangrul, Manikkundu, Monoharpur I and Monoharpur II.

== Demographics ==
=== Population ===
According to the 2011 Census of India Chandrakona I CD block had a total population of 136,006, all of which were rural. There were 69,820 (51%) males and 66,186 (49%) females. Population in the age range 0–6 years was 15,077. Scheduled Castes numbered 46,759 (34.38%) and Scheduled Tribes numbered 7,516 (5.53%).

As per the 2001 census, Chandrakona I block had a total population of 118,077, out of which 60,277 were males and 57,800 were females. Chandrakona I block registered a population growth of 13.98 per cent during the 1991-2001 decade. Decadal growth for the combined Midnapore district was 14.87 per cent. Decadal growth in West Bengal was 17.45 per cent.

Large villages (with 4,000+ population) in Chandrakona I CD block are (2011 census figures in brackets): Jara (5,569) and Mangul (5,462).

Other villages Chandrakona I CD block include (2011 census figures in brackets): Manikkunda (2,828) and Lakshipur (2,939).

=== Literacy ===
As per the 2011 census the total number of literate persons in Chandrakona I CD block was 95,452 (78.93% of the population over 6 years) out of which males numbered 52,777 (85.00% of the male population over 6 years) and females numbered 42,675 (72.53% of the female population over 6 years).The gender gap in literacy rates was 12.48%.

See also – List of West Bengal districts ranked by literacy rate

Literacy in CD blocks of
Paschim Medinipur district
Jhargram subdivision
Binpur I – 69.74%
Binpur II – 70.46%
Gopiballavpur I – 65.44%
Gopiballavpur II – 71.40%
Jamboni – 72.63%
Jhargram – 72.23%
Nayagram – 63.70%
Sankrail – 73.35%
Medinipur Sadar subdivision
Garhbeta I – 72.21%
Garhbeta II – 75.87%
Garhbeta III – 73.42%
Keshpur – 77.88%
Midnapore Sadar – 70.48%
Salboni – 74.87%
Ghatal subdivision
Chandrakona I – 78.93%
Chandrakona II – 75.96%
Daspur I – 83.99%
Daspur II – 85.62%
Ghatal – 81.08%
Kharagpur subdivision
Dantan I – 73.53%
Dantan II – 82.45%
Debra – 82.03%
Keshiari – 76.78%
Kharagpur I – 77.06%
Kharagpur II – 76.08%
Mohanpur – 80.51%
Narayangarh – 78.31%
Pingla – 83.57%
Sabang – 86.84%
2011 Census: CD Block Wise

Primary Census Abstract Data

=== Language and religion ===
Religion in Chandrakona I CD block (2011)
Hinduism	87.14%
Islam	12.00%
Other (tribal religion)	0.56%
Other or not stated	0.30%

In the 2011 census Hindus numbered 118,511 and formed 87.14% of the population in Chandrakona I CD block. Muslims numbered 16,328 and formed 12.00% of the population. Others numbered 1,167 and formed 0.86% of the population. Others include Addi Bassi, Marang Boro, Santal, Saranath, Sari Dharma, Sarna, Alchchi, Bidin, Sant, Saevdharm, Seran, Saran, Sarin, Kheria, Christians and other religious communities. In 2001, Hindus were 88.50% and Muslims 11.17% of the population respectively.

Languages of Chandrakona I CD block (2011)
1. Bengali (96.7%)
2. Santali (3.19%)
3. Others (0.10%)

At the time of the 2011 census, 96.71% of the population spoke Bengali and 3.19% Santali as their first language.

== BPL families ==
In Chandrakona I CD block 44.21% families were living below poverty line in 2007.

According to the District Human Development Report of Paschim Medinipur: The 29 CD blocks of the district were classified into four categories based on the poverty ratio. Nayagram, Binpur II and Jamboni CD blocks have very high poverty levels (above 60%). Kharagpur I, Kharagpur II, Sankrail, Garhbeta II, Pingla and Mohanpur CD blocks have high levels of poverty (50-60%), Jhargram, Midnapore Sadar, Dantan I, Gopiballavpur II, Binpur I, Dantan II, Keshiari, Chandrakona I, Gopiballavpur I, Chandrakona II, Narayangarh, Keshpur, Ghatal, Sabang, Garhbeta I, Salboni, Debra and Garhbeta III CD Blocks have moderate levels of poverty (25-50%) and Daspur II and Daspur I have low levels of poverty (below 25%).

== Economy ==
=== Infrastructure ===
132 or 100% of mouzas in Chandrakona I CD block were electrified by 31 March 2014.

129 mouzas in Chandrakona I CD block had drinking water facilities in 2013-14. There were 111 fertiliser depots, 108 seed stores and 28 fair price shops in the CD block.

=== Agriculture ===
Persons engaged in agriculture
in Chandrakona I CD block
1. Bargadars (8.62%)
2. Patta holders (24.5%)
3. Small farmers (2.55%)
4. Marginal farmers (25.6%)
5. Agricultural labourers (38.8%)

Although the Bargadari Act of 1950 recognised the rights of bargadars to a higher share of crops from the land that they tilled, it was not fully implemented. Large tracts, beyond the prescribed limit of land ceiling, remained with the rich landlords. From 1977 onwards major land reforms took place in West Bengal. Land in excess of land ceiling was acquired and distributed amongst the peasants. Following land reforms land ownership pattern has undergone transformation. In 2013-14, persons engaged in agriculture in Chandrakona I CD block could be classified as follows: bargadars 8.62%, patta (document) holders 24.49%, small farmers (possessing land between 1 and 2 hectares) 2.55%, marginal farmers (possessing land up to 1 hectare) 25.56% and agricultural labourers 38.77%.

In 2005-06 the nett cropped area in Chandrakona I CD block was 17,000 hectares out of geographical area of 22,228 hectares and the area in which more than one crop was grown was 12,827 hectares.

The extension of irrigation has played a role in growth of the predominantly agricultural economy. In 2013-14, the total area irrigated in Chandrakona I CD Block was 13,019 hectares, out of which 500 hectares were irrigated by canals, 600 hectares by tank water, 8,186 hectares by deep tubewells, 2,905 hectares by shallow tubewells, 240 hectares by river lift irrigation and 588 hectares by other methods. In 2013-14, Chandrakona I CD block produced 3,786 tonnes of Aman paddy, the main winter crop, from 3,266 hectares, 30,208 tonnes of Boro paddy (spring crop) from 7,546 hectares and 20,064 tonnes of potatoes from 1,900 hectares. It also produced oilseeds.

=== Banking ===
In 2013-14, Chandrakona I CD block had offices of 9 commercial banks and 1 gramin bank.

== Transport ==
Chandrakona I CD block has 8 ferry services and 1 originating/ terminating bus route. The nearest railway station is 30 km from the CD block headquarters.

State Highway 4 (West Bengal) running from Jhalda (in Purulia district) to Digha (in Purba Medinipur district) passes through this block.

== Education ==
In 2013-14, Chandrakona I CD block had 117 primary schools with 8,218 students, 7 middle schools with 1,077 students, 14 high schools with 6,807 students and 9 higher secondary schools with 7,887 students. Chandrakona I CD block had 257 institutions for special and non-formal education with 9,715 students,

The United Nations Development Programme considers the combined primary and secondary enrolment ratio as the simple indicator of educational achievement of the children in the school going age. The infrastructure available is important. In Chandrakona I CD block out of the total 116 primary schools in 2008-2009, 37 had pucca buildings, 21 partially pucca, and 58 multiple type.

== Healthcare ==
In 2014, Chandrakona I CD block had 1 rural hospital and 5 primary health centres with total 68 beds and 8 doctors. It had 23 family welfare sub centres and 1 family welfare centre. 5,083 patients were treated indoor and 141,866 patients were treated outdoor in the hospitals, health centres and subcentres of the CD Block.

Khirpai Rural Hospital, with 30 beds at Khirpai, is the major government medical facility in the Chandrakona I CD block. There are primary health centres at: Ramjibanpur (with 10 beds), Ramkrishnapur (PO Tatarpara) (with 10 beds), Mangrul (PO Goaldanga Mangrul) (with 10 beds), Dingal (PO Dingal-Kumargeria) (with 10 beds) and Jara (with 2 beds).
