= Babarsa =

Traditional confection of West Bengal, India

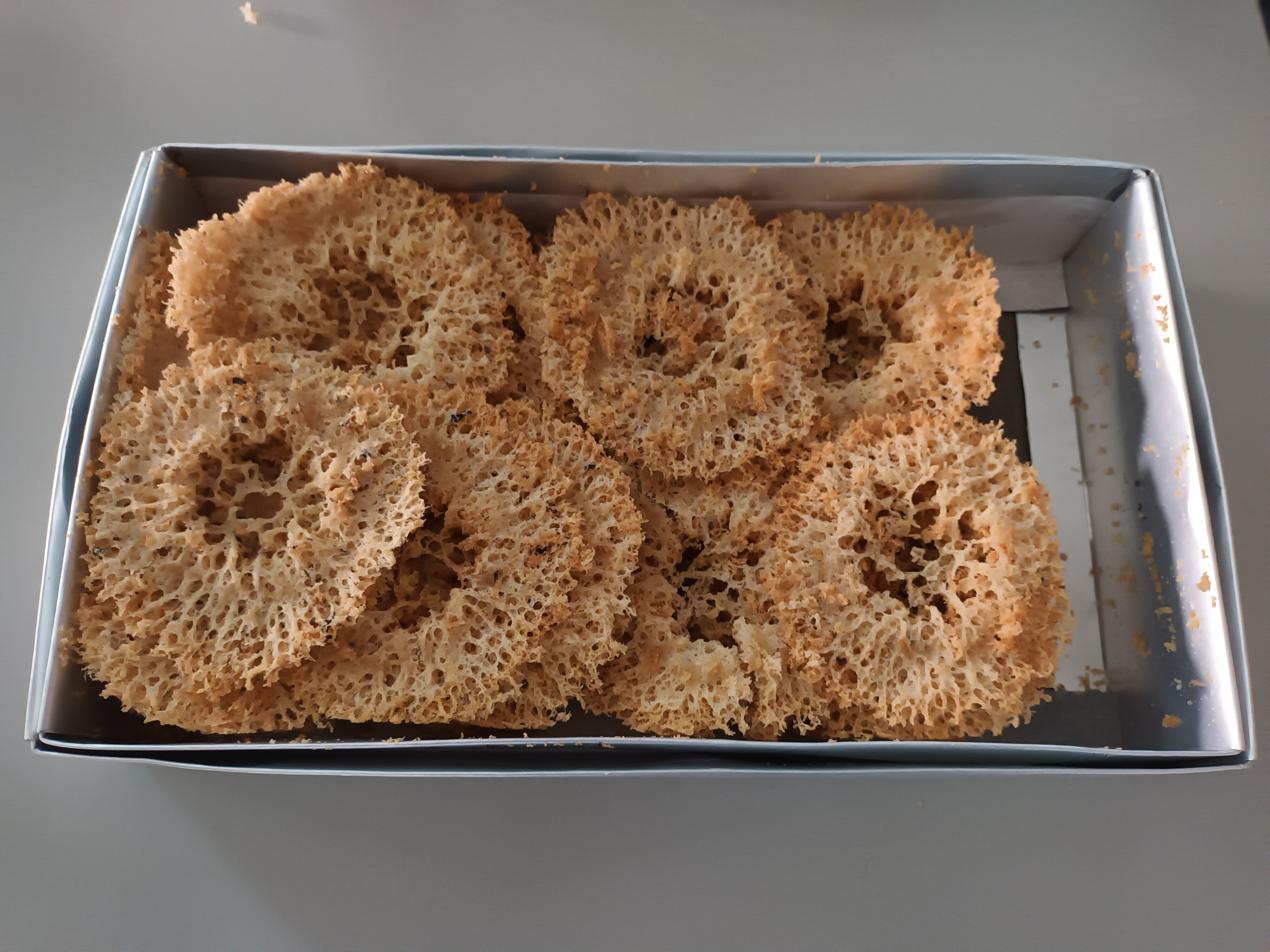
- Babarsa
- Alternative names: Babarsa of Kshirpai
- Place of origin: West Bengal
- Region or state: Khirpai, Ghatal, West Bengal
- Main ingredients: Milk, Flour, Ghee, Sugar

Babarsa (also spelled Babarsha; Bengali: বাবরসা) is a traditional confection originating from the town of Khirpai, Ghatal, in the West Medinipur district of West Bengal, India. The origin of this sweet is the site of Kshirpai. This sweet is made with flour and ghee.

== Name origins ==
In the middle of the eighteenth century, Khirpai were continuously attacked by Bargis. To escape they started to leave Khirpai, while some stayed back. An Englishman named Edward Babarasa helped the locals defeat the Bargis. After this incident, a local trader innovated this sweet to honour Edward.

According to other sources, this sweet or fresh food was given to Emperor Babur in Delhi. Since then, its name has been Babarasa. However, there is no historical basis for the second theory.

== History ==
Bababorsha is one of the sweet balls of Bengal. This sweet is about 250 years old. The origin of these sweets before 1750 originates from the ancient habitation of Khirpai (Ghatal). The name of this sweets comes from the name "Edward Babar".

== Cooking method ==
Originally made from flour, milk and ghee, Babarsa is instead sometimes fried in daladea instead of ghee in the Magygandara market. They are kept in the mold to give it shape, and after this the juice is served at the time of the meal. Earlier, there was a tradition of covering this confection with honey.

=== Materials ===
The materials used in Babarasa are: flour, milk, ghee.

== Problems ==
Babarsa is on the list of addictive foods, and due to this negative publicity it has produced less business for confectioners, and profits are down. For this reason, many people are leaving the business and going to other professions. As a result, some have predicted that this sweet will gradually become extinct.

Artisans say, "Our family does not live by creating only Babaras. All day work, which is very little in the fee alliance. So there is no interest in this new generation." Earlier, three or four Babarsa were sold in the previous money. But as of 2017, the price of 8 rupees or 10 rupees for Babasaheb. It is impossible to sell below the price market. So the buyers are turning away from this sweet. If they get any help from the government, they will get a solution.
