= Khirpai =

Khirpai Kshirpai
- City
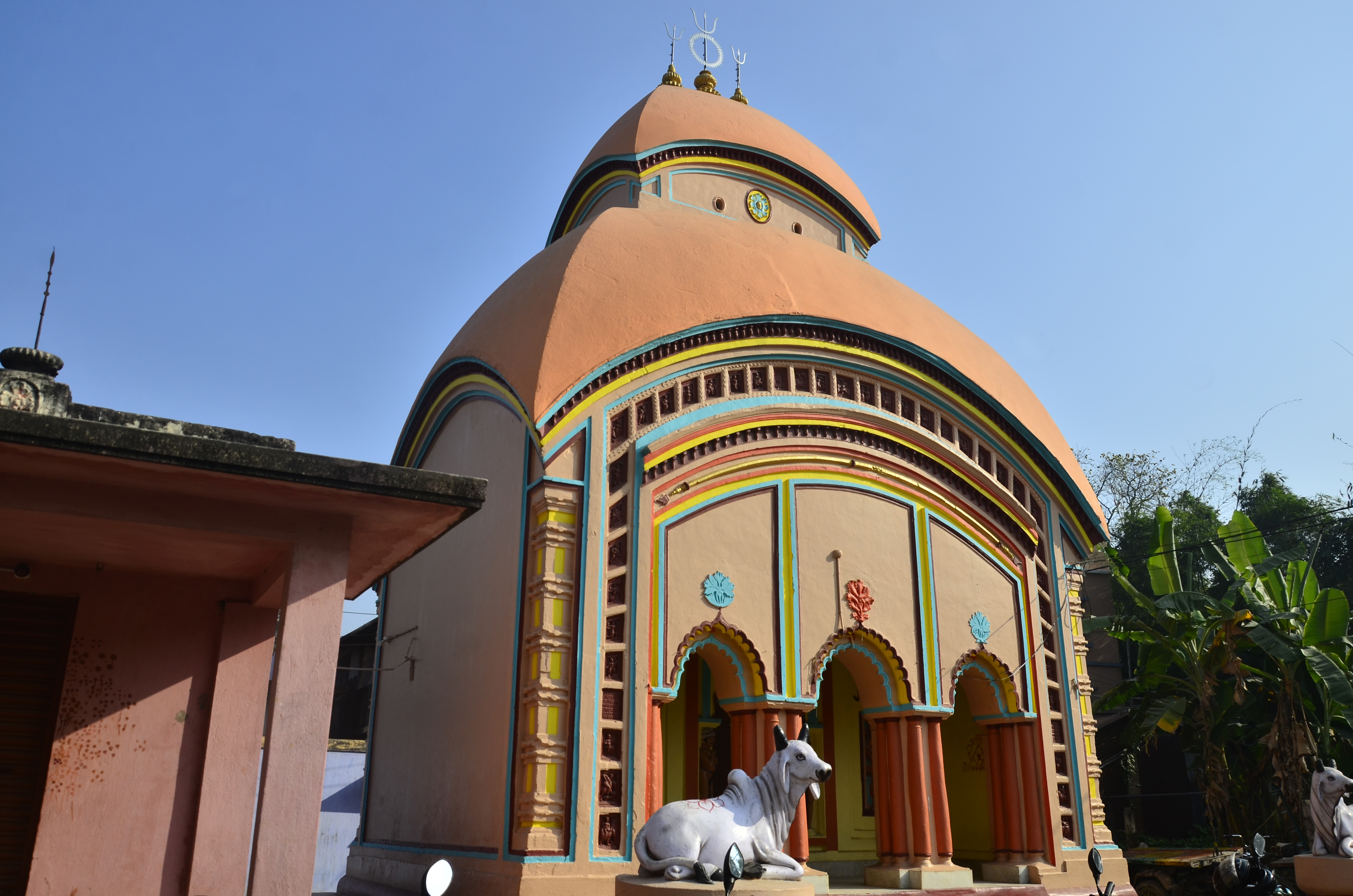
- At-chala Sitalananda Shiva temple in Khirpai

- Location in West Bengal, India Khirpai (India)
- Coordinates: 22.7°N 87.62°E
- Country: India
- State: West Bengal
- District: West Midnapore

Government
  - Type: Municipality
  - Body: Khirpai Municipality

Area
  - Total: 11.65 km^{2} (4.50 sq mi)

Population (2011)
  - Total: 16,384
  - Density: 1,406/km^{2} (3,642/sq mi)

Languages
  - Official: Bengali, English
- Time zone: UTC+5:30 (IST)
- PIN: 721232
- Sex ratio: 931 ♂/♀
- Lok Sabha constituency: Arambagh
- Vidhan Sabha constituency: Chandrakona
- Website: paschimmedinipur.gov.in

Khirpai, also known as Kshirpai, is a city and a municipality in the Ghatal subdivision of the Paschim Medinipur district in the state of West Bengal, India. Earlier it was part of Hooghly. The city is situated between Ghatal and Chandrakona, near the banks of the rivers Shilabati and Kethai, and is one of the oldest municipalities in India. Khirpai is also famous for its Babarsa, a special type of sweetmeat, which is not available elsewhere.

== History ==
In the 18th and 19th century, Khirpai was a large and popular trading place. Cotton and handicrafts of this area were exported to foreign lands. In the British period, Khirpai became famous for indigo plantations. Also in the British Era, it was a famous business centre. At that time neel (indigo powder) was the main product. On the south-east side of Khirpai town, there is a lake; ruins can be found in the south-east corner of this lake. Once, it was the trade-house of the European merchants. French, Dutch, Portuguese and British traders came here for trade before 1660, and by that time, they thronged here for purchasing cotton and silk, which were of exclusive status. In 1763, the French built a workshop in this place.

In the 18th century, Khirpai become famous for cotton-cloth weaving and manufacture of brush and bell metal. The weaving industry was further developed in the second half of the century by the location of an important factory of the East India Company in Khirpai. But in the 19th century, the industry declined owing to the withdrawal of the company from commercial undertakings, and particularly due to the importation of British-made piece goods. Khirpai lost status as a business centre, and the population density of Khirpai decreased gradually from that time.

== Geography ==
Cities and towns in Ghatal subdivision of Paschim Medinipur district
M: municipal city/ town, R: rural/ urban centre, H: historical/ religious centre
Owing to space constraints in the small map, the actual locations in a larger map may vary slightly

=== Location ===
Khirpai is located at 22.7°N 87.62°E. It has an average elevation of 7 metres (26 feet).

=== Area overview ===
Ishwar Chandra Vidyasagar, scholar, social reformer and a key figure of the Bengal Renaissance, was born at Birsingha on 26 September 1820.

Ghatal subdivision, shown in the map alongside, has alluvial soils. Around 85% of the total cultivated area is cropped more than once. It has a density of population of 1,099 per km^{2}, but being a small subdivision only a little over a fifth of the people in the district reside in this subdivision. 14.33% of the population lives in urban areas and 86.67% lives in the rural areas.

Note: The map alongside presents some of the notable locations in the subdivision. All places marked in the map are linked in the larger full screen map.

== Demographics ==
As of 2011 India census, Khirpai had a population of 16,384. Males constituted 50.4% of the population, and females were 49.6%. Khirpai has an average literacy rate of 82.39%, higher than the state average of 76.26%: male literacy is 88.58%, and female literacy is 76.09%. In Khirpai, 11% of the population was under 6 years of age.

As of 2001 India census, Khirpai had a population of 14,548. Males constituted 57% of the population, and females were 43%. Khirpai has an average literacy rate of 77%, higher than the national average of 59.5%: male literacy is 81%, and female literacy is 62%. In Khirpai, 11% of the population was under 6 years of age.

== CD Block HQ ==
The headquarters of Chandrakona I Block are located at Bamaria in Kshirpai.

== Economy ==
The main economy of this area is agriculture. Besides the town area, the people of the villagers basically earn their livelihood by producing crops, like paddy, potato, wheat, jute and vegetables of different kinds. A few of the people are government employees, school teachers, or employed in other small private sectors. The financial status of most of the people is in middle-class and lower middle-class category.

== Transportation ==
Khirpai is well connected by roads/highways with other nearby cities like Midnapore, Kharagpur, Kolkata, Howrah, Ghatal, Burdwan, Panskura, Kanthi, Tamluk, Hooghly. For local transportation, buses, taxi, minibus, or cycle-rikshaws are available. Panskura and Chandrokona road railway stations are two of the nearest railway stations.

State Highway 4 (West Bengal) running from Jhalda (in Purulia district) to Digha (in Purba Medinipur district) and State Highway 7 (West Bengal) running from Rajgram (in Birbhum district) to Midnapore (in Paschim Medinipur district) cross at Khirpai. SBSTC has a bus depot at Khirpai.

== Education ==
There are many schools and primary schools in Khirpai. There is one coeducational high school and one girls school. The name of the schools are: 1. Khirpai H.S. Multipurpose School 2. Khirpai S.K. Barman Memorial Girls High School. Ghatal Rabindra Satabarsiki Mahavidyalaya and Chandrakona Vidyasagar Mahavidyalaya are two nearby colleges of Khirpai. The nearest polytechnic college is Ghatal Government Polytechnic, and an ITI college is Ghatal Government ITI in Birsingha.

== Health ==
There is a hospital in the Khirpai town and one community-based primary health center run by Khirpai municipality. People of Khirpai and its nearby areas mainly depend on the hospital. Also there are many private chambers of doctors in Khirpai. The health of common people is generally well.

== Culture ==
Among many festivals in Khirpai, 'Santoshi Mela' is the most popular. Many people from Khirpai and its nearby villages take part in the Santoshi Mela. There are also some religious places in Khirpai named Pancharatna Mandir, Parbatinath Temple, and Radha Damodar Jew Temple.

Radhamadhab Temple of Malpara is on Ghatal-Khirpai Road. This age-old temple is Pancharatna ("ratna" means pinnacle), but the terracotta works still exist. These works depict Krishnalila, Dasavatar and the battle of Ram Ravana, even hunting scenes and floral ornamentations. It was built in 1817. Radha Damodar Jew Temple is famous for its terracota works. ‘Dalan Mandir’ in Paharipara is also notable. This temple is dedicated to Singhabahini, incarnation of Devi Durga. This was built in 1746 and probably the oldest temple of the Khirpai region.

The massive structure of Sitalanda Tin Temple is situated in Hattala (Khirpai). It faces southwards and is of the atchala style. Some terracotta specimens still can be found. It was built by Pani family in 1839. There is a Shiva temple in the village Gangadaspur, Ward no.-6 of the Khirpai municipality which bears the age-old culture of this locality. This temple is almost 300 years old, and it is the largest and highest of this area. The temple has been newly renovated.

The regular Bengali festivals, like Durga Puja, Saraswati Puja and Kali Puja, are well attended. Other common pujas in the worship of Sitala, Jagaddhatri, Holi, Janmastami, or Bheema Puja also take place. A special type of sweet named Babarsa, only in Bengal, is available here.

David J. McCutchion mentions:

- The Khargeswara Siva temple as an at-chala with figures around the façade. It measures 23’ x 20’
- The Sitalananda Siva temple in the same category as the Khargeswara Siva temple. Built in 1839, it measures 21’ x 18’ 8”.
- The renovated temple of the Asram belonged to the eka-ratna with ridged rekha tower category.
- The Madana-Mohana temple as a pancha-ratna with ridged rekha turrets and porch on triple archway of the standard West Bengal type. Built in 1817, it measures around 16’ 6” square.

== Healthcare ==
Khirpai Rural Hospital, with 30 beds at Khirpai, is the major government medical facility in the Chandrakona I CD block.
