= Sonakhali, Paschim Medinipur =

Sonakhali
- Village
- Location in West Bengal, India Sonakhali (India)
- Coordinates: 22°33′12.0″N 87°46′14.2″E
- Country: India
- State: West Bengal
- District: Paschim Medinipur

Population (2011)
  - Total: 2,014

Languages
  - Official: Bengali, English
- Time zone: UTC+5:30 (IST)
- PIN: 721146
- Lok Sabha constituency: Ghatal
- Vidhan Sabha constituency: Daspur
- Website: paschimmedinipur.gov.in

Sonakhali is a village, in Daspur II CD Block in Ghatal subdivision of Paschim Medinipur district in the state of West Bengal, India.

== Geography ==
Cities and towns in Ghatal subdivision of Paschim Medinipur district
M: municipal city/ town, R: rural/ urban centre, H: historical/ religious centre
Owing to space constraints in the small map, the actual locations in a larger map may vary slightly

=== Location ===
Sonakhali is located at 22°33′12.0″N 87°46′14.2″E.

=== Area overview ===
Ishwar Chandra Vidyasagar, scholar, social reformer and a key figure of the Bengal Renaissance, was born at Birsingha on 26 September 1820.

Ghatal subdivision, shown in the map alongside, has alluvial soils. Around 85% of the total cultivated area is cropped more than once. It has a density of population of 1,099 per km^{2}, but being a small subdivision only a little over a fifth of the people in the district reside in this subdivision. 14.33% of the population lives in urban areas and 86.67% lives in the rural areas.

Note: The map alongside presents some of the notable locations in the subdivision. All places marked in the map are linked in the larger full screen map.

== Civic administration ==
=== CD block HQ ===
The headquarters of Daspur II CD block are located at Sonakhali.

== Demographics ==
As per 2011 Census of India Sonakhali had a total population of 2,014 of which 1,008 (50%) were males and 1,006 (50%) were females. Population below 6 years was 213. The total number of literates in Sonakhali was 1,544 (76.66% of the population over 6 years).

== Transport ==
Sonakhali stands at the meeting point of Harekrishnapur-Sonakhali Road and Gopiganj-Sultannagar Road.

== Healthcare ==
Sonakhali Rural Hospital, with 30 beds at Sonakhali, is the major government medical facility in the Daspur II CD block.
