= Ghatal subdivision =

Ghatal Subdivision ঘাটাল
- Subdivision
- Ghatal Subdistrict
- Interactive map of Ghatal Subdivision
- Coordinates: 22.67°N 87.72°E
- Country: India
- State: West Bengal
- District: Paschim Medinipur
- Headquarters: Ghatal

Government
  - Type: Legislative Assembly

Area
  - Total: 953.09 km^{2} (367.99 sq mi)

Population
  - Total: 1,047,679
  - Density: 1,099.2/km^{2} (2,847.0/sq mi)

Languages
  - Official: Bengali, English
- Time zone: UTC+5:30 (IST)
- ISO 3166 code: IN-WB
- Vehicle registration: WB50, WB34, WB36
- Website: wb.gov.in

Ghatal subdivision is an administrative subdivision of Paschim Medinipur district in the state of West Bengal, India. Earlier it was part of Hooghly District. Later in 1872 it was merged with Medinipur District.

== Subdivisions ==
Paschim Medinipur district is divided into the following administrative subdivisions, after separation of Jhargram subdivision from the district in 2017:

| Subdivision | Headquarters | Area km^{2} | Population (2011) | Rural population % (2011) | Urban population % (2011) |
|---|---|---|---|---|---|
| Medinipur Sadar | Midnapore | 2,441.50 | 1,435,321 | 86.05 | 13.95 |
| Kharagpur | Kharagpur | 2,913.17 | 2,293,909 | 85.67 | 14.33 |
| Ghatal | Ghatal | 953.09 | 1,047,679 | 87.94 | 12.06 |
| Paschim Medinipur district | Midnapore | 6,307.76 | 4,776,909 | 86.28 | 13.72 |

Ghatal subdivision has a population density of 1,099 per km^{2}. 21.93% of the district population resides in this subdivision.

== Administrative units ==
Ghatal subdivision has 3 police stations, 5 community development blocks, 5 panchayat samitis, 48 gram panchayats, 656 mouzas, 630 inhabited villages and 5 municipalities. The municipalities are: Chandrakona, Khirpai, Ramjibanpur, Ghatal and Kharar. The subdivision has its headquarters at Ghatal.

Cities and towns in Ghatal subdivision of Paschim Medinipur district
M: municipal city/ town, R: rural/ urban centre, H: historical/ religious centre
Owing to space constraints in the small map, the actual locations in a larger map may vary slightly

== Police stations ==
Police stations in Ghatal subdivision have the following features and jurisdiction:

| Police Station | Area covered km^{2} | Municipal Town | CD Block |
|---|---|---|---|
| Chandrakona | n/a | Chandrakona, Khirpai, Ramjibanpur | Chandrakona I, Chandrakona II |
| Ghatal | n/a | Ghatal, Kharar | Ghatal |
| Daspur | n/a | - | Daspur I, Daspur II |

== Gram panchayats ==
The subdivision contains 48 gram panchayats under 5 community development blocks:

- Chandrakona I block: Jara, Mangrul, Monoharpur–I, Lakshmipur, Manikkundu and Monoharpur–II.
- Chandrakona II block: Bandipur–I, Basanchora, Bhagabantapur–II, Bandipur–II, Bhagabantapur–I and Kuapur.
- Daspur I block: Basudevpur, Nandanpur–I, Panchberia, Sarberia–II, Daspur–I, Nandanpur–II, Rajnagar, Daspur–II, Niz Narajol and Sarberia–I.
- Daspur II block: Benai, Goura, Kheput Dakshnibarh, Ranichak, Chaipat, Jyotghanashyam, Khukurdaha, Sahachak, Dudhkomra, Kamalpur, Nishchintapur, Gochhati, Khanjapur and Palashpai.
- Ghatal block: Ajabnagar–I, Dewanchak–I, Mansuka–I, Monoharpur–I, Ajabnagar–II, Dewanchak–II, Mansuka–II, Monoharpur–II, Beersingha, Irhpala, Mohanpur and Sultanpur.

== Blocks ==
Community development blocks in Ghatal subdivision are:

| CD Block | Headquarters | Area km^{2} | Population (2011) | SC % | ST % | Literacy rate % | Census Towns |
|---|---|---|---|---|---|---|---|
| Chandrakona I | Khirpai | 193.54 | 136,006 | 34.38 | 5.53 | 78.93 | - |
| Chandrakona II | Chandrakona | 150.44 | 123,269 | 30.28 | 5.55 | 76.96 | - |
| Ghatal | Ghatal | 216.05 | 219,555 | 32.90 | 1.76 | 81.08 | - |
| Daspur I | Daspur | 168.30 | 203,987 | 24.34 | 2.79 | 83.99 | - |
| Daspur II | Sonakhali | 165.45 | 238,529 | 12.54 | 0.25 | 85.62 | - |

== Education ==
Paschim Medinipur district had a literacy rate of 78.00% as per the provisional figures of the census of India 2011. Medinipur Sadar subdivision had a literacy rate of 76.23%, Kharagpur subdivision 80.51% and Ghatal subdivision 82.55%.

Given in the table below (data in numbers) is a subdivision-wise comprehensive picture of the education scenario in Paschim Medinipur district, after separation of Jhargram subdivision, for the year 2013-14.

| Subdivision | Primary School | | Middle School | | High School | | Higher Secondary School | | General College, Univ | | Technical / Professional Instt | | Non-formal Education | |
| Subdivision | Institution | Student | Institution | Student | Institution | Student | Institution | Student | Institution | Student | Institution | Student | Institution | Student |
|---|---|---|---|---|---|---|---|---|---|---|---|---|---|---|
| Medinipur Sadar | 1,086 | 88,909 | 118 | 13,825 | 45 | 38,322 | 118 | 143,051 | 8 | 11,058 | 15 | 2,281 | 2,844 | 112,971 |
| Kharagpur | 1,576 | 131,008 | 126 | 8,902 | 127 | 63,099 | 170 | 177,644 | 7 | 9,058 | 12 | 11,190 | 4,365 | 147,242 |
| Ghatal | 786 | 59,984 | 30 | 2,543 | 88 | 44,064 | 66 | 65,255 | 4 | 4,413 | 5 | 626 | 1,501 | 54,169 |
| Paschim Medinipur district | 3,448 | 279,901 | 274 | 25,270 | 260 | 145,485 | 354 | 385,950 | 19 | 24,529 | 32 | 14,097 | 8,700 | 314,382 |

Note: Primary schools include junior basic schools; middle schools, high schools and higher secondary schools include madrasahs; technical schools include junior technical schools, junior government polytechnics, industrial technical institutes, industrial training centres, nursing training institutes etc.; technical and professional colleges include engineering colleges, medical colleges, para-medical institutes, management colleges, teachers training and nursing training colleges, law colleges, art colleges, music colleges etc. Special and non-formal education centres include sishu siksha kendras, madhyamik siksha kendras, adult high schools, centres of Rabindra mukta vidyalaya, recognised Sanskrit tols, institutions for the blind and other handicapped persons, Anganwadi centres, reformatory schools etc.

The following institutions are located in Ghatal subdivision:

- Chandrakona Vidyasagar Mahavidyalaya at Chandrakona was established in 1985.
- Institute of Science and Technology at Dhurbila, Dhamkuria, Chandrakona, near Prayag Film City, a private engineering and management college, was established in 2006.
- Narajole Raj College at Narajole was established in 1966.
- Chaipat Saheed Pradyot Bhattacharya Mahavidyalaya at Chaipat was established in 2007.
- Ghatal Government Polytechnic

== Healthcare ==
The table below (all data in numbers) presents an overview of the subdivision-wise medical facilities available and patients treated, after the separation of Jhargram, in the hospitals, health centres and sub-centres in 2014 in Paschim Medinipur district.

| Subdivision | Health & Family Welfare Deptt, WB | | | | Other State Govt Deptts | Local bodies | Central Govt Deptts / PSUs | NGO / Private Nursing Homes | Total | Total Number of Beds | Total Number of Doctors | Indoor Patients | Outdoor Patients |
| Subdivision | Hospitals | Rural Hospitals | Block Primary Health Centres | Primary Health Centres | Other State Govt Deptts | Local bodies | Central Govt Deptts / PSUs | NGO / Private Nursing Homes | Total | Total Number of Beds | Total Number of Doctors | Indoor Patients | Outdoor Patients |
|---|---|---|---|---|---|---|---|---|---|---|---|---|---|
| Medinipur Sadar | 2 | 5 | 1 | 15 | 3 | - | 1 | 26 | 53 | 2,117 | 323 | 121,486 | 1,375,817 |
| Kharagpur | 2 | 8 | 2 | 27 | 2 | 1 | 2 | 54 | 98 | 1841 | 197 | 93,110 | 1,814,309 |
| Ghatal | 1 | 4 | 1 | 15 | - | - | - | 46 | 67 | 988 | 66 | 46,006 | 742,984 |
| Paschim Medinipur district | 5 | 17 | 24 | 77 | 5 | 1 | 3 | 126 | 208 | 4,946 | 586* | 260,602 | 3,933,110 |

- Excluding nursing homes

=== Medical facilities ===
Medical facilities in the Ghatal subdivision are as follows:

Hospitals: (Name, location, beds)

- Ghatal Subdivisional Hospital, Ghatal (M), 200 beds

Rural hospitals: (Name, CD block, location, beds)

- Khirpai Rural Hospital, Chandrakona I CD block, Khirpai, 30 beds
- Chandrakona Rural Hospital, Chandrakona II CD block, Chandrakona, 60 beds
- Daspur Rural Hospital, Daspur I CD block, Daspur, 30 beds
- Sonakhali Rural Hospital, Daspur II CD block, Sonakhali, 30 beds

Block primary health centres: (Name, CD block, location, beds)

- Viidyasagar Block Primary Health Centre, Ghatal CD block, Birsingha, 10 beds

Primary health centres : (CD block-wise)(CD block, PHC location, beds)

- Chandrakona I CD block: Ramjibanpur (10), Ramkrishnapur (PO Tatarpara) (10), Mangrul (PO Goaldanga Mangrul) (10), Dingal (PO Dingal-Kumargeria) (10), Jara (2)
- Chandrrakona II CD block: Basanchora (PO Chhatraganj) (10), Bhagabantapur (4),
- Ghatal CD block: Khasbarh (6), Natuk (10),
- Daspur I: Makrampur (PO Choto Makrampur) (4), Narajole (10), Sekenday (2)
- Daspur II: Khukurda (10), Nischintapur (6), Chaipat (6)

== Electoral constituencies ==
Lok Sabha (parliamentary) and Vidhan Sabha (state assembly) constituencies in Paschim Medinipur district were as follows from 2006:

| Lok Sabha constituency | Vidhan Sabha constituency | Reservation | CD Block and/or Gram panchayats |
|---|---|---|---|
| Jhargram (ST) | Garbeta | None | Garhbeta I CD Block and Amlasuli, Jogardanga, Piyasala and Sarboth GPs of Garhbeta II CD Block. |
| | Salboni | None | Bhimpur, Bishnupur, Debgram, Lalgeria and Salboni GPs of Salboni CD Block, Goaltor, Gohaldanga, Jeerapara, Makli, Patharpara and Pingbani GPs of Garhbeta II CD Block and Garhbeta III CD Block. |
| | Other assembly segments outside the district | | |
| Medinipur | Egra | None | Egra municipality, Egra I CD Block, and Basudevpur, Deshbandhu, Dubda, Manjusree, Paniparul, Sarbaday and Bibekananda GPs of Egra II CD Block in Purba Medinipur district. |
| | Dantan | None | Dantan II and Mohanpur CD Blocks, and Chak Islampur GP of Dantan I CD Block. |
| | Keshiary | ST | Keshiari CD Block, and Alikosha, Angua, Ainkola, Dantan I, Dantan II, Monoharpur, Salikotha and Tararui GPs of Dantan I CD Block. |
| | Kharagpur Sadar | None | Kharagpur municipality and Kharagpur Railway Settlement of Kharagpur I CD Block. |
| | Narayangarh | None | Narayangarh |
| | Kharagpur | None | Kharagpur I CD Block, and Banpura, Panchkhuri I, Panchkhuri II, Pathra and Shiromoni GPs of Midnapore Sadar CD Block. |
| | Medinipur | None | Midnapore municipality, Chandra, Dherua, Monidaha and Tantigeria GPs of Midnapore Sadar CD Block and Bankibandh, Garhmal, Karnagarh, Kashijora and Shatpati GPs of Salboni CD Block. |
| Ghatal | Panskura Paschim | None | Panskura I CD Block in Purba Medinipur district. |
| | Sabang | None | Sabang CD Block, and Jalchak I, Jalchak II and Maligram GPs of Pingla CD Block. |
| | Pingla | None | Dhaneswarpur, Gobordhanpur, Jamna, Karkai, Kshirai, Kusumda and Pindurui GPs of Pingla CD Block and Kharagpur II CD Block |
| | Debra | None | Debra CD Block |
| | Daspur | None | Daspur II, and Basudevpur, Daspur I, Daspur II, Nandanpur I, Nandanpur II and Panchberia GPs of Daspur I CD Block. |
| | Ghatal | SC | Ghatal municipality, Ghatal CD Block, Khara municipality, and Rajnagar, Sarberia I and Sarberia II GPs of Daspur I CD Block. |
| | Keshpur | SC | Keshpur CD Block. |
