= Temathani =

Locality in Paschim Medinipur, West Bengal, India

Temathani তেমাথানি
- Locality
- Interactive map of Temathani
- Coordinates: 22.229°N 87.561°E
- Country: India
- State: West Bengal
- District: Paschim Medinipur
- CD block: Sabang

Languages
  - Official: Bengali, English
- Time zone: UTC+05:30 (IST)
- PIN: 721166
- Telephone code: 03222
- Lok Sabha constituency: Ghatal
- Vidhan Sabha constituency: Sabang

Temathani (Bengali: তেমাথানি) is a locality and road junction in the Sabang community development block of the Kharagpur subdivision, Paschim Medinipur district, in the Indian state of West Bengal. A 2025 news report described it as the hub of the Sabang block. It lies in the village of Lutunia (PIN 721166).

== Geography ==
Temathani lies on the Egra–Patashpur–Temathani–Balichak–Debra road, which connects it with Egra, Balichak and Debra. A road also links Temathani with Sabang.

== Transport ==
Buses on several routes pass through Temathani. They connect it with Patashpur, Egra, Kantakhali, Narayangarh, Pingla, Debra and Medinipur. In 2025 the state Public Works Department built an air-conditioned waiting room for bus passengers at Temathani. It cost ₹95 lakh (US$100,000), took about two years to build and seats more than 30 people. Irrigation minister Manas Bhunia opened it during the Durga Puja festival.

== Government offices ==
The Kaliaghai–Kapaleswari–Baghai Project Division of the state Irrigation and Waterways Directorate (Western Circle II) has its office at Temathani, and so does the division's Sub-Division No. I. Both offices run flood control rooms during the monsoon.

== Economy and amenities ==
The 2011 census village directory for Lutunia records a weekly haat, a regular market, a commercial or co-operative bank, a sub post office, a public distribution system shop and an agricultural marketing society within the village. It also records a degree college, a primary health sub-centre, a dispensary, a veterinary hospital, a sports field, a cinema or video hall, an assembly polling station and a birth and death registration office. The village is connected to a major district road. Rice and bread were listed as the main commodities manufactured in the village.

Temathani has an irrigation bungalow, the Temathani Irrigation Bungalow. The Temathani Pallishree ground has been used for large public meetings. In April 2026, Abhishek Banerjee addressed a political rally there.

== Demographics ==
The 2011 census of India does not list Temathani as a separate village. The figures below are for the Sabang CD block as a whole. The block had 270,492 people, all of them rural, of whom 138,924 were male and 131,568 female. Scheduled Castes numbered 36,064 (13.33%) and Scheduled Tribes 16,818 (6.22%).

=== Religion ===
In 2011, Hindus made up 93.71% of the block's population, Muslims 6.12%, and others 0.17%.

=== Language ===
Bengali was the mother tongue of 95.26% of the block's population in 2011. Santali (2.77%) and Urdu (1.04%) were the other main languages.

== Education ==
Sabang Sajanikanta Mahavidyalaya, also known as Sabang College or Temathani College, is at Temathani in Lutunia. It was founded in 1970 and is affiliated to Vidyasagar University. It offers undergraduate courses in arts, science and commerce. The college was named after Sajanikanta Giri (1895–1982), whose donation funded its founding. Its foundation stone was laid on 26 January 1968.
