= Deula, Medinipur =

Deula is a village in West Bengal, India. It is administrated under the Bakhrabad gram panchayat, Narayangarh (community development block), Kharagpur Subdivision, West Medinipur District, West Bengal.

== Demographics ==
In the 2001 census, the village of Deula had 891 inhabitants, with 449 males (50.4%) and 442 females (49.6%), for a gender ratio of 984 females per thousand males.
