= Lutunia =

- Village
- Location in West Bengal, India Lutunia (India)
- Coordinates: 22°13′32.2″N 87°33′43.9″E
- Country: India
- State: West Bengal
- District: Paschim Medinipur

Population (2011)
  - Total: 2,634

Languages
  - Official: Bengali, English
- Time zone: UTC+5:30 (IST)
- PIN: 721166
- Telephone/STD code: 03222
- Lok Sabha constituency: Ghatal
- Vidhan Sabha constituency: Sabang
- Website: paschimmedinipur.gov.in

Lutunia is a village in the Sabang CD block in the Kharagpur subdivision of the Paschim Medinipur district in the state of West Bengal, India. The locality of Temathani lies within the village.

== Geography ==
Cities and towns in the southern portion of Kharagpur subdivision (including Dantan I & II, Mohanpur, Keshiary, Narayangarh and Sabang CD blocks) of Paschim Medinipur district
CT: census town, R: rural/ urban centre, H: historical/ religious centre
Owing to space constraints in the small map, the actual locations in a larger map may vary slightly

=== Location ===
Lutunia is located at 22°13′32.2″N 87°33′43.9″E.

=== Area overview ===
Kharagpur subdivision, shown partly in the map alongside, mostly has alluvial soils, except in two CD blocks in the west – Kharagpur I and Keshiary, which mostly have lateritic soils. Around 74% of the total cultivated area is cropped more than once. With a density of population of 787 per km^{2}nearly half of the district’s population resides in this subdivision. 14.33% of the population lives in urban areas and 86.67% lives in the rural areas.

Note: The map alongside presents some of the notable locations in the subdivision. All places marked in the map are linked in the larger full screen map.

== Demographics ==
According to the 2011 Census of India, Lutunia had a total population of 2,634 of which 1,326 (50%) were males and 1,308 (50%) were females. Population in the age range 0– 6 years was 274. The total number of literate persons in Lutunia was 2,072 (78.66% of the population over 6 years).

== Amenities ==
The 2011 census village directory records the following within Lutunia:

- Commerce: a weekly haat, a regular market, a commercial or co-operative bank, a public distribution system shop and an agricultural marketing society.
- Health: a primary health sub-centre, a dispensary and a veterinary hospital.
- Other services: a sub post office, a sports field, a cinema or video hall, an assembly polling station and a birth and death registration office.

The village is connected to a major district road. Rice and bread were listed as the main commodities manufactured in the village. Of its 142.6 hectares, 108.8 hectares were sown, and 68.8 hectares of that were irrigated by wells and tube wells.

== Temathani ==
Temathani (Bengali: তেমাথানি) is a locality and road junction in Lutunia. A 2025 news report described it as the hub of the Sabang block. The Kaliaghai–Kapaleswari–Baghai Project Division of the state Irrigation and Waterways Directorate has its office at Temathani, as does the division's Sub-Division No. I.

== Transport ==
Lutunia is on the Egra-Patashpur-Temathani-Balichak-Debra Road. Harir Hat Road connects it to Sabang. Buses from Temathani run to Patashpur, Egra, Kantakhali, Narayangarh, Pingla, Debra and Medinipur. In 2025 the state Public Works Department opened an air-conditioned waiting room for bus passengers at Temathani. It cost ₹95 lakh (US$99,000) and seats more than 30 people.

== Education ==
Sabang Sajani Kanta Mahavidyalaya, also known as Sabang College or Temathani College, is at Temathani. It was established in 1970 and is affiliated to Vidyasagar University. It offers honours courses in Bengali, English, economics, history, political science, philosophy and accountancy. It also offers general courses in arts, science and commerce. The college owes its origin to a princely donation by Sajanikanta Giri.
