= Jhargram (community development block) =

- Community development block
- Coordinates: 22.45°N 86.98°E
- Country: India
- State: West Bengal
- District: Jhargram

Government
  - Type: Federal democracy

Area
  - Total: 515.11 km^{2} (198.89 sq mi)
- Elevation: 82 m (269 ft)

Population (2011)
  - Total: 170,097
  - Density: 330.21/km^{2} (855.25/sq mi)

Languages
  - Official: Bengali, Santali, Kudmali/Kurmali, English
- Time zone: UTC+5:30 (IST)
- PIN: 721507 (Jhargram); 721513 (Manikpara)
- Area code: 03221
- ISO 3166 code: IN-WB
- Vehicle registration: WB-49 & WB-50
- Literacy: 72.23%
- Lok Sabha constituency: Jhargram
- Vidhan Sabha constituency: Jhargram, Gopiballavpur
- Website: jhargram.gov.in

Jhargram is a community development block that forms an administrative division in Jhargram subdivision of Jhargram district in the Indian state of West Bengal.

== History ==
=== Red corridor ===
106 districts spanning 10 states across India, described as being a part of the Left Wing Extremism activities, constitutes the Red corridor. In West Bengal the districts of Pashim Medinipur, Bankura, Purulia and Birbhum are part of the Red corridor. However, as of July 2016, there has been no reported incidents of Maoist related activities from these districts for the previous 4 years. In the period 2009-2011 LWE violence resulted in more than 500 deaths and a similar number missing in Paschim Medinipur district.

The Lalgarh movement, which started attracting attention after the failed assassination attempt on Buddhadeb Bhattacharjee, then chief minister of West Bengal, in the Salboni area of Paschim Medinipur district, on 2 November 2008 and the police action that followed, had also spread over to these areas. The movement was not just a political struggle but an armed struggle that concurrently took the look of a social struggle. A large number of CPI (M) activists, and others active in different political parties, were killed. Although the epi-centre of the movement was Lalgarh, it was spread across 19 police stations in three adjoining districts – Paschim Medinipur, Bankura and Purulia, all thickly forested and near the border with Jharkhand. The deployment of CRPF and other forces started on 11 June 2009. The movement came to an end after the 2011 state assembly elections and change of government in West Bengal. The death of Kishenji, the Maoist commander, on 24 November 2011 was the last major landmark.

From 2009 Maoist violence had rapidly spread across eleven western CD blocks of the district: Binpur I, Binpur II, Salboni, Grahbeta II, Jamboni, Jhargram, Midnapore Sadar, Gopiballavpur I, Gopiballavpur II, Sankrail and Nayagram.

== Geography ==
The Chota Nagpur Plateau gradually slopes down creating an undulating area with infertile laterite rocks/ soil. In Jhargram CD Block 90% of the cultivated area has lateritic soil and 10% has alluvial soil. Jhargram CD block is drought prone with a particularly severe drought situation.

Jhargram is located at 22°27′N 86°59′E.

Jhargram CD block is bounded by Binpur I and Midnapore Sadar CD blocks in the north, Kharagpur I and Sankrail CD locks in the east, Gopiballavpur II CD block in the south and Jamboni CD block in the west.

It is located 39 km from Midnapore, the district headquarters.

Jhargram CD block has an area of 515.11 km^{2}. It has 1 panchayat samity, 13 gram panchayats, 129 gram sansads (village councils), 604 mouzas and 489 inhabited villages. Jhargram police station serves this block. Headquarters of this CD block is at Jhargram City.

Jhargram CD block had a forest cover of 15,400 hectares, against a total geographical area of 53,951 hectares in 2005-06.

Gram panchayats of Jhargram block are: Aguiboni, Bundhgora, Chandri, Chubka, Dudhkundi, Lodhasuli, Manikpara, Sardiha, Nendahbahara, Patasimul, Radhanagar, Salboni, Sapdhara.

== Demographics ==
=== Population ===
According to the 2011 Census of India, Jhargram CD block had a total population of 170,097, all of which were rural. There were 85,970 (51%) males and 84,127 (49%) females. Population in the age range 0–6 years was 20,331. Scheduled Castes numbered 25,220 (14.83%) and Scheduled Tribes numbered 38,625 (22.71%).

According to the 2001 census, Jhargram block had a total population of 153,381, out of which 78,362 were males and 75,019 were females. Jhargram block registered a population growth of 14.64 per cent during the 1991-2001 decade. Decadal growth for the combined Midnapore district was 14.87 per cent. Decadal growth in West Bengal was 17.45 per cent.

Large villages (with 4,000+ population) in Jhargarm CD block are (2011 census figures in brackets): Manikpara (4,239).

Other villages in Jhargram CD block are (2011 census figures in brackets): Chandri (1,699), Radhanagar (3,476), Sardiha (660), Chubka (577), Lodhasuli (1,102) and Patashimul (486).

=== Literacy ===
According to the 2011 census the total number of literate persons in Jhargram CD block was 108,179 (72.23% of the population over 6 years) out of which males numbered 60,974 (80.55% of the male population over 6 years) and females numbered 47,205 (63.73% of the female population over 6 years). The gender gap in literacy rates was 16.82%.

See also – List of West Bengal districts ranked by literacy rate

Literacy in CD blocks of
Paschim Medinipur district
Jhargram subdivision
Binpur I – 69.74%
Binpur II – 70.46%
Gopiballavpur I – 65.44%
Gopiballavpur II – 71.40%
Jamboni – 72.63%
Jhargram – 72.23%
Nayagram – 63.70%
Sankrail – 73.35%
Medinipur Sadar subdivision
Garhbeta I – 72.21%
Garhbeta II – 75.87%
Garhbeta III – 73.42%
Keshpur – 77.88%
Midnapore Sadar – 70.48%
Salboni – 74.87%
Ghatal subdivision
Chandrakona I – 78.93%
Chandrakona II – 75.96%
Daspur I – 83.99%
Daspur II – 85.62%
Ghatal – 81.08%
Kharagpur subdivision
Dantan I – 73.53%
Dantan II – 82.45%
Debra – 82.03%
Keshiari – 76.78%
Kharagpur I – 77.06%
Kharagpur II – 76.08%
Mohanpur – 80.51%
Narayangarh – 78.31%
Pingla – 83.57%
Sabang – 86.84%
2011 Census: CD Block Wise

Primary Census Abstract Data

=== Language and religion ===
Religion in Jhargram CD block (2011)
Hinduism	91.03%
Other (tribal religion)	4.66%
Islam	3.70%
Other or not stated	0.61%

In the 2011 census Hindus numbered 154,823 and formed 91.03% of the population in Jhargram CD block. Muslims numbered 6,296 and formed 3.70% of the population. Others numbered 8,960 and formed 5.27% of the population. Others include Addi Bassi, Marang Boro, Santal, Saranath, Sari Dharma, Sarna, Alchchi, Bidin, Sant, Saevdharm, Seran, Saran, Sarin, Kheria, Christian and other religious communities. In 2001, Hindus were 84.44%, Muslims 3.27% and tribal religions 12.04% of the population respectively.

Languages of Jhargram CD block (2011)
1. Bengali (86.8%)
2. Santali (11.7%)
3. Others (1.51%)

At the time of the 2011 census, 86.83% of the population spoke Bengali and 11.66% Santali as their first language.

== BPL families ==
In Jhargram CD lock 49.02% families were living below poverty line in 2007.

According to the District Human Development Report of Paschim Medinipur: The 29 CD blocks of the district were classified into four categories based on the poverty ratio. Nayagram, Binpur II and Jamboni CD blocks have very high poverty levels (above 60%). Kharagpur I, Kharagpur II, Sankrail, Garhbeta II, Pingla and Mohanpur CD blocks have high levels of poverty (50-60%), Jhargram, Midnapore Sadar, Dantan I, Gopiballavpur II, Binpur I, Dantan II, Keshiari, Chandrakona I, Gopiballavpur I, Chandrakona II, Narayangarh, Keshpur, Ghatal, Sabang, Garhbeta I, Salboni, Debra and Garhbeta III CD blocks have moderate levels of poverty (25-50%) and Daspur II and Daspur I CD blocks have low levels of poverty (below 25%).

== Economy ==
=== Infrastructure ===
498 or 82% of mouzas in Jhargram CD block were electrified by 31 March 2014.

490 mouzas in Jhargram CD block had drinking water facilities in 2013-14. There were 56 fertiliser depots, 35 seed stores and 61 fair price shops in the CD block.

=== Agriculture ===
Persons engaged in agriculture
in Jhargram CD block
1. Bargadars (6.84%)
2. Patta holders (28.9%)
3. Small farmers (2.56%)
4. Marginal farmers (22.2%)
5. Agricultural labourers (39.5%)

Although the Bargadari Act of 1950 recognised the rights of bargadars to a higher share of crops from the land that they tilled, it was not fully implemented. Large tracts, beyond the prescribed limit of land ceiling, remained with the rich landlords. From 1977 onwards major land reforms took place in West Bengal. Land in excess of land ceiling was acquired and distributed amongst the peasants. Following land reforms land ownership pattern has undergone transformation. In 2013-14, persons engaged in agriculture in Jhargram CD block could be classified as follows: bargadars 6.84%, patta (document) holders 28.94%, small farmers (possessing land between 1 and 2 hectares) 2.56%, marginal farmers (possessing land up to 1 hectare) 22.22% and agricultural labourers 39.45%.

In 2005-06 net cropped area in Jharagram CD block was 53,951 hectares and the area in which more than one crop was grown was 15,321 hectares.

The extension of irrigation has played a role in growth of the predominantly agricultural economy. In 2013-14, the total area irrigated in Jhargram CD block was 15,565 hectares, out of which 5,500 by canal water, 1,900 hectares by tank water, 200 hectares by deep tube wells, 4,450 by shallow tube wells, 160 hectares by river lift irrigation, 350 hectares by open dug wells and 3,005 hectares by other methods.

In 2013-14, Jhargram CD block produced 75,846 tonnes of Aman paddy, the main winter crop, from 35,328 hectares, 1,994 tonnes of Aus paddy (summer crop) from 942 hectares, 848 tonnes of wheat from 268 hectares and 37,648 tonnes of potatoes from 1,356 hectares. It also produced mustard.

=== Banking ===
In 2013-14, Jhargram CD block had offices of 15 commercial banks and 2 gramin banks.

== Transport ==
Jhargram CD block has 5 ferry services and 4 originating/ terminating bus routes.

The Kharagpur-Tatanagar line of South Eastern Railway passes through this CD block and there is a station at Jhargram.

== Education ==
In 2013-14, Jhargram CD block had 200 primary schools with 10,801 students, 31 middle schools with 1,815 students, 4 high schools with 1,690 students and 17 higher secondary schools with 16,875 students. Jhargram CD block had 1 general college with 934 students, 3 professional/ technical institutions with 1,019 students and 440 institutions for special and non-formal education with 15,130 students. There was 1 general college in Jhargram municipal area (outside Jhargram CD block).

The United Nations Development Programme considers the combined primary and secondary enrolment ratio as the simple indicator of educational achievement of the children in the school going age. The infrastructure available is important. In Jhargram CD block out of the total 199 primary schools in 2008-2009, 149 had pucca buildings, 8 partially pucca, 5 kucha and 37 multiple type.

Vivekananda Satavarshiki Mahavidyalaya was established in 1964 at Manikpara. It is affiliated to Vidyasagar University. It offers courses in Bengali, Santali, English, Sanskrit, history, political science, philosophy, economics, commerce, physics, chemistry and mathematics.

== Healthcare ==
In 2014, Jhargram CD block had 1 block primary health centre, 4 primary health centres and 1 private nursing home with total 52 beds and 9 doctors. It had 32 family welfare sub centres and 1 family welfare centre. 2,727 patients were treated indoor and 89,581 patients were treated outdoor in the hospitals, health centres and subcentres of the CD block.

Mohanpur Block Primary Health Centre, with 10 beds at Montipa-Mohanpur, is the major government medical facility in the Jhargram CD block. There are primary health centres at: Lauriadam (PO Rajabas) (with 10 beds), Manikpara (with 10 beds), Chubka (PO Khalseuli) (with 6 beds) and Chandri (with 6 beds).
