= Dantan I =

- Community development block
- Coordinates: 21.911°N 87.270°E
- Country: India
- State: West Bengal
- District: Paschim Medinipur

Government
  - Type: Federal democracy

Area
  - Total: 257.07 km^{2} (99.26 sq mi)
- Elevation: 19 m (62 ft)

Population (2011)
  - Total: 172,107
  - Density: 669.49/km^{2} (1,734.0/sq mi)

Languages
  - Official: Bengali, Santali, English
- Time zone: UTC+5:30 (IST)
- PIN: 721426 (Dantan)
- Telephone/STD code: 03229
- ISO 3166 code: IN-WB
- Vehicle registration: WB-34
- Literacy: 73.53%
- Lok Sabha constituency: Medinipur
- Vidhan Sabha constituency: Dantan, Keshiary
- Website: paschimmedinipur.gov.in

Dantan I is a community development block that forms an administrative division in the Kharagpur subdivision of Paschim Medinipur district in the Indian state of West Bengal.

== History ==
According to some, the name is derived from Dandabhukti, which was an ancient territorial unit of Gupta Empire.

Dantan, was later a part of Hijli Kingdom. It was a thriving town on the route to the Jagannath Temple in Puri when Chaitanya Mahaprabhu reportedly passed through here in the 16th century.

Dantan is the location of at least three temples from the nineteenth century, the Jagannath Temple, the Shyamaleswar Temple, and the Chandaneswar Temple. All three have been built in the curvilinear rekha style that is common to temples of Orissa.

Near the town, there are two major tanks, the Bidyadhar and the Sarasankha. The Bidyadhar tank was created by a minister named Bidyadhara of Pratap Rudra Deva, king of Gajapati Kingdom. The Sarasankha tank is attributed to the King Gaudeswar Gaudadhipati Maharajadhiraja Shashanka who ruled in the seventh century A.D.

== Geography ==
The Danatan area is a monotonous rice plain with numerous waterways and tidal creeks intersecting it. The tidal creeks are lined with embankments to prevent flooding of the fields. Much of the area is water-logged. In Dantan I CD Block 100% of the cultivated area has highly productive alluvial soil.

Dantan is located at 21°54′40″N 87°16′12″E. The Subarnarekha River flows past the Dantan I block.

Dantan I CD block is bounded by Keshiari and Narayangarh CD blocks in the north, Dantan II and Mohanpur CD blocks in the east, Jaleswar CD block/tehsil, in Balasore district in Odisha, in the south and in the west.

It is located 65 km from Midnapore, the district headquarters.

Dantan I CD block has an area of 257.07 km^{2}. It has 1 panchayat samity, 9 gram panchayats, 124 gram sansads (village councils), 199 mouzas and 188 inhabited villages. Dantan police station serves this block. Headquarters of this CD Block is at Dantan.

The climate in Dantan follows a hot-tropical monsoon pattern with highs in the mid 40s°C in the summer (generally April to June), mid 30s°C during the monsoon season (June to August) and low 30s°C for most of the other times of the year. Winters (December to January) are usually mild with lows in the 10s°C and high in the low to mid 20s°C. Most of the precipitation is from the southeast monsoon which may bring in excess of 1500 mm of rainfall.

Tornadoes are relatively rare in West Bengal and Bangladesh, but one did occur on March 24, 1998 killing over 250 near Dantan. Initially, this tornado was reported as a cyclone with wind speeds of close to 200 km/h that caused the destruction of an estimated 9,000 houses and injuries to 3,000 people. Later the event was characterized as a tornado.

Gram panchayats of Dantan I block/ panchayat samiti are: Alikosha, Angua, Anikola, Chakismailpur, Dantan I, Dantan II, Monoharpur, Salikotha and Tararui.

== Demographics ==
=== Population ===
According to the 2011 Census of India Dantan I CD block had a total population of 172,107, of which 165,921 were rural and 6,186 were urban. There were 87,601 (51%) males and 84,506 (49%) females. Population in the age mix 0–6 years was 20,209. Scheduled Castes numbered 29,235 (16.99%) and Scheduled Tribes numbered 28,183 (16.38%).

As per the 2001 census, Dantan I block had a total population of 151,343, out of which 77,291 were males and 74,052 were females. Dantan I block registered a population growth of 19.41 per cent during the 1991-2001 decade. Decadal growth for the combined Midnapore district was 14.87 per cent. Decadal growth in West Bengal was 17.45 per cent.

Census Town in Dantan I CD block are (2011 census figure in brackets): Chaulia (6,186).

Large villages (with 4,000+ population) in Dantan I CD block are (2011 census figures in brackets): Kakrajit (4203), Shalikota (4,237) and Sarrang (4,925).

Other villages in Dantan I CD block include (2011 census figures in brackets): Anikola (1,579), Chak Ismailpur (3,403), Angua (2,337) and Monoharpur (2,884).

=== Literacy ===
According to the 2011 census the total number of literate persons in Dantan I CD block was 111,691 (73.53% of the population over 6 years) out of which males numbered 63,358 (82.02% of the male population over 6 years) and females numbered 48,333 (64.82% of the female population over 6 years). The gender gap in literacy rates was 17.20%.

See also – List of West Bengal districts ranked by literacy rate

Literacy in CD blocks of
Paschim Medinipur district
Jhargram subdivision
Binpur I – 69.74%
Binpur II – 70.46%
Gopiballavpur I – 65.44%
Gopiballavpur II – 71.40%
Jamboni – 72.63%
Jhargram – 72.23%
Nayagram – 63.70%
Sankrail – 73.35%
Medinipur Sadar subdivision
Garhbeta I – 72.21%
Garhbeta II – 75.87%
Garhbeta III – 73.42%
Keshpur – 77.88%
Midnapore Sadar – 70.48%
Salboni – 74.87%
Ghatal subdivision
Chandrakona I – 78.93%
Chandrakona II – 75.96%
Daspur I – 83.99%
Daspur II – 85.62%
Ghatal – 81.08%
Kharagpur subdivision
Dantan I – 73.53%
Dantan II – 82.45%
Debra – 82.03%
Keshiari – 76.78%
Kharagpur I – 77.06%
Kharagpur II – 76.08%
Mohanpur – 80.51%
Narayangarh – 78.31%
Pingla – 83.57%
Sabang – 86.84%
2011 Census: CD Block Wise

Primary Census Abstract Data

=== Languages and religion ===
Religion in Dantan I CD block (2011)
Hinduism	93.11%
Islam	5.64%
Christianity	1.00%
Other or not stated	0.25%

In the 2011 census Hindus numbered 160,254 and formed 93.11% of the population in Dantan I CD block. Muslims numbered 9,716 and formed 5.64% of the population. Christians numbered 1,724 and formed 1.00% of the population. Others numbered 413 and formed 0.25% of the population. Others include Addi Bassi, Marang Boro, Santal, Saranath, Sari Dharma, Sarna, Alchchi, Bidin, Sant, Saevdharm, Seran, Saran, Sarin, Kheria, and other religious communities. In 2001, Hindus were 93.03%, Muslims 4.99% and Christians 0.60% of the population respectively.

Languages of Dantan I CD block (2011)
1. Bengali (79.0%)
2. Santali (13.0%)
3. Hindi (3.31%)
4. Odia (2.53%)
5. Urdu (1.30%)
6. Others (0.91%)

At the time of the 2011 census, 78.99% of the population spoke Bengali, 12.96% Santali, 3.31% Hindi, 2.53% Odia and 1.30% Urdu as their first language.

== BPL families ==
In Dantan I CD block 48.81% families were living below poverty line in 2007.

According to the District Human Development Report of Paschim Medinipur: The 29 CD blocks of the district were classified into four categories based on the poverty ratio. Nayagram, Binpur II and Jamboni CD blocks have very high poverty levels (above 60%). Kharagpur I, Kharagpur II, Sankrail, Garhbeta II, Pingla and Mohanpur CD blocks have high levels of poverty (50-60%), Jhargram, Midnapore Sadar, Dantan I, Gopiballavpur II, Binpur I, Dantan II, Keshiari, Chandrakona I, Gopiballavpur I, Chandrakona II, Narayangarh, Keshpur, Ghatal, Sabang, Garhbeta I, Salboni, Debra and Garhbeta III CD blocks have moderate levels of poverty (25-50%) and Daspur II and Daspur I CD blocks have low levels of poverty (below 25%).

== Economy ==
=== Infrastructure ===
183 or 92% of mouzas in Dantan I CD block were electrified by 31 March 2014.

194 mouzas in Dantan I CD block had drinking water facilities in 2013-14. There were 76 fertiliser depots, 45 seed stores and 42 fair price shops in the CD block.

=== Agriculture ===
Persons engaged in agriculture
in Dantan I CD block
1. Bargadars (4.96%)
2. Patta holders (24.7%)
3. Small farmers (3.04%)
4. Marginal farmers (31.6%)
5. Agricultural labourers (35.7%)

Although the Bargadari Act of 1950 recognised the rights of bargadars to a higher share of crops from the land that they tilled, it was not implemented fully. Large tracts, beyond the prescribed limit of land ceiling, remained with the rich landlords. From 1977 onwards major land reforms took place in West Bengal. Land in excess of land ceiling was acquired and distributed amongst the peasants. Following land reforms land ownership pattern has undergone transformation. In 2013-14, persons engaged in agriculture in Dantan I CD block could be classified as follows: bargadars 4.96%, patta (document) holders 24.71%, small farmers (possessing land between 1 and 2 hectares) 3.04%, marginal farmers (possessing land up to 1 hectare) 31.58% and agricultural labourers 35.71%.

In 2005-06 the nett cropped area in Dantan I CD block was 20,663 hectares out of the total geographical area of 25,552 hectares and the area in which more than one crop was grown was 11,876 hectares.

The extension of irrigation has played a role in growth of the predominantly agricultural economy. In 2013-14, the total area irrigated in Dantan I CD block was 7,102 hectares, out of which 50 hectares were irrigated by canal water, 5 hectares by tank water, 1,545 hectares by deep tubewells, 4,942 hectares by shallow tubewells, 60 hectares by river lift irrigation and 500 hectares by other methods.

In 2013-14, Dantan I CD block produced 41,760 tonnes of Aman paddy, the main winter crop, from 21,217 hectares, 55 tonnes of Aus paddy (summer crop) from 27 hectares, 36,602 tonnes of Boro paddy (spring crop) from 9,146 hectares and 110,309 tonnes of sugar cane from 500 hectares. It also produced oilseeds.

=== Banking ===
In 2013-14, Dantan I CD block had offices of 8 commercial banks and 2 gramin banks.

== Transport ==
Dantan I CD block has 2 ferry services and 4 originating/ terminating bus routes.

The Kolkata-Chennai line of South Eastern Railway passes through this CD block and there are stations at Dantan and Angua railway station.

The Kolkata-Chennai Golden Quadrilateral National Highway 16 or Kolkata-Bengaluru Asian Highway 45 passes through this block. Dantan is well connected with Nayagram via Manoharpur Bhasraghat Road.

== Education ==
In 2013-14, Dantan I CD block had 108 primary schools with 8,539 students, 17 middle schools with 914 students, 8 high schools with 4,308 students and 10 higher secondary schools with 11,397 students. Dantan I CD block had 1 general college with 1,319 students and 335 institutions for special and non-formal education with 13,290 students.

The United Nations Development Programme considers the combined primary and secondary enrolment ratio as the simple indicator of educational achievement of the children in the school going age. The infrastructure available is important. In Dantan I CD block out of the total 108 primary schools in 2008-2009, 52 had pucca buildings, 26 partially pucca, 10 kucha and 20 multiple type.

Bhatter College is a co-educational college established in 1963 at Dantan. Affiliated to Vidyasagar University, it offers honours courses in Bengali, English, Sanskrit, history, philosophy, political science, economics, geography, education, music, and accounting and finance. It also offers general courses in arts, science and commerce. It introduced MA in rural management in 2013-14.

== Healthcare ==
In 2014, Dantan I CD block had 1 block primary health centre, 2 primary health centres and 1 private nursing home with total 32 beds and 8 doctors. It had 27 family welfare sub centres and 1 family welfare centre. 4,426 patients were treated indoor and 62,237 patients were treated outdoor in the hospitals, health centres and subcentres of the CD block.

Dantan Block Primary Health Centre, with 10 beds at Dantan is the major government medical facility in the Dantan I CD block. There are primary health centres at: Bhuringi (PO Anikole) (with 2 beds) and Rajnagar (with 10 beds).
