= Kharagpur subdivision =

- Subdivision
- Interactive map of Kharagpur subdivision
- Coordinates: 22.02°N 87.11°E
- Country: India
- State: West Bengal
- District: Paschim Medinipur
- Headquarters: Kharagpur

Government
  - Type: Community development block

Area
  - Total: 2,913.17 km^{2} (1,124.78 sq mi)

Population
  - Total: 2,293,901
  - Density: 787.424/km^{2} (2,039.42/sq mi)

Languages
  - Official: Bengali, English
- Time zone: UTC+5:30 (IST)
- ISO 3166 code: IN-WB
- Vehicle registration: WB
- Website: wb.gov.in

Kharagpur subdivision is an administrative subdivision of Paschim Medinipur district in the state of West Bengal, India.

== Subdivisions ==
Paschim Medinipur district is divided into the following administrative subdivisions, after separation of Jhargram subdivision from the district in 2017:

Subdivision	Headquarters	Area km^{2}	Population (2011)	Rural population % (2011)	Urban population % (2011)
Medinipur Sadar	Midnapore	2,441.50	1,435,321	86.05	13.95
Kharagpur	Kharagpur	2,913.17	2,293,909	85.67	14.33
Ghatal	Ghatal	953.09	1,047,679	87.94	12.06
Paschim Medinipur district	Midnapore	6,307.76	4,776,909	86.28	13.72

Kharagpur subdivision has a population density of 787 per km^{2}. 48.02% of the district population resides in this subdivision.

Cities and towns in the northern part of Kharagpur subdivision (including Khararagpur I & II, Debra and Pingla CD blocks) of Paschim Medinipur district
M: municipal city/ town, CT: census town, R: rural/ urban centre, H: historical/ religious centre, F: facilities
Owing to space constraints in the small map, the actual locations in a larger map may vary slightly
Cities and towns in the southern portion of Kharagpur subdivision (including Dantan I & II, Mohanpur, Keshiary, Narayangarh and Sabang CD blocks) of Paschim Medinipur district
CT: census town, R: rural/ urban centre, H: historical/ religious centre
Owing to space constraints in the small map, the actual locations in a larger map may vary slightly

== Administrative units ==
Kharagpur subdivision has 10 police stations, 10 community development blocks, 10 panchayat samitis, 99 gram panchayats, 2,679 mouzas, 2486 inhabited villages, 1 municipality and 5 census towns. The single municipality is at Kharagpur. The census towns are: Balichak, Chaulia, Deuli, Kharagpur Railway Settlement and Kalaikunda. The subdivision has its headquarters at Kharagpur.

== Police stations ==
Police stations in Kharagpur subdivision have the following features and jurisdiction:

Police station	Area covered km^{2}	Municipal town	CD block
Kharagpur (Town)	n/a	Kharagpur	-
Kharagpur (Local)	n/a	-	Kharagpur I, Kharagpur II
Debra	n/a	-	Debra
Pingla	n/a	-	Pingla
Keshiary	n/a	-	Keshiari
Dantan	n/a	-	Dantan I
Belda	n/a	-	Dantan II
Narayangarh	n/a	-	Narayangarh
Mohanpur	n/a	-	Mohanpur
Sabang	n/a	-	Sabang

== Gram panchayats ==
The subdivision contains 99 gram panchayats under 10 community development blocks:

- Dantan I block: Ainkola, Chak Ismailpur, Monoharpur, Alikosha, Dantan–I, Salikotha, Angua, Datan–II and Tarurui.
- Dantan II block: Haripur, Porolda, Sauri Kotbar, Turka, Jenkapur, Sabra and Talda.
- Pingla block: Dhaneswarpur, Jalchak–II, Kshirai, Pindurui, Gobordhanpur, Jamna, Kusumda, Jalchak–I, Karkai and Maligram.
- Kharagpur I block: Arjuni, Gopali, Kalaikunda, Vetia, Barkola, Hariatara and Khelarh.
- Kharagpur II block: Chakmakampur, Kaliara–II, Paparara–I, Changual, Lachhmapur, Paparara–II, Kaliara–I, Palsya and Sankoa.
- Sabang block: Balpai, Danrra, Nawgaon, Bhemua, Bishnupur, Dashgram, Narayanbarh, Bural, Debhog, Sabang, Chaulkuri, Mohar and Sharta.
- Mohanpur block: Mohanpur, Sautia, Tanua, Neelda and Shialsai.
- Narayangarh block: Bakhrabad, Hemchandra, Manya, Pakurseni, Belda–I, Khursi, Mokrampur, Ranisarai, Belda–II, Kunarpur, Narayangarh, Tutranga, Gramraj, Kushbasan, Narma and Kashipur.
- Keshiari block: Baghasthi, Keshiari, Lalua, Gaganeswar, Khajra, Nachipur, Ghritagram, Kusumpur and Santrapur.
- Debra block: Bhabanipur, Duan–I, Khanamohan, Satyapur, Bharatpur, Duan–II, Malighati, Snarpur–Loyada, Debra–I, Golgram, Radhamohanpur–I, Debra–II, Jalimanda, Radhamohanpur–II.

== Blocks ==
Community development blocks in Kharagpur subdivision are:

CD block	Headquarters	Area km^{2}	Population (2011)	SC %	ST %	Literacy rate %	Census towns
Debra	Balichak	342.41	288,619	12.99	20.48	82.03	1
Pingla	Pingla	224.48	194,809	8.43	9.92	83.57	
Keshiari	Keshiary	292.09	149,269	22.95	34.25	76.78	
Dantan I	Dantan	257.07	172,107	16.99	16.38	73.53	1
Dantan II	Dhaneswarpur	185.56	155,017	8.92	7.01	82.45	
Narayangarh	Narayangarh	499.48	302,620	18.62	22.50	78.31	1
Mohanpur	Mohanpur	137.49	111,901	10.30	5.39	80.51	
Sabang	Sabang	305.00	270,472	13.33	6.22	86.84	
Kharagpur I	Satkul	313.31	258,040	17.99	16.45	77.06	2
Kharagpur II	Madpur	265.63	183,440	18.61	25.57	76.08	

== Education ==
Paschim Medinipur district had a literacy rate of 78.00% as per the provisional figures of the census of India 2011. Medinipur Sadar subdivision had a literacy rate of 76.23%, Kharagpur subdivision 80.51% and Ghatal subdivision 82.55%.

The table below gives a subdivision-wise comprehensive picture of the education scenario in Paschim Medinipur district, after separation of Jhargram subdivision, for the year 2013-14.

Subdivision	Primary School		Middle School		High School		Higher Secondary School		General College, Univ		Technical / Professional Instt		Non-formal Education	
Subdivision	Institution	Student	Institution	Student	Institution	Student	Institution	Student	Institution	Student	Institution	Student	Institution	Student
Medinipur Sadar	1,086	88,909	118	13,825	45	38,322	118	143,051	8	11,058	15	2,281	2,844	112,971
Kharagpur	1,576	131,008	126	8,902	127	63,099	170	177,644	7	9,058	12	11,190	4,365	147,242
Ghatal	786	59,984	30	2,543	88	44,064	66	65,255	4	4,413	5	626	1,501	54,169
Paschim Medinipur district	3,448	279,901	274	25,270	260	145,485	354	385,950	19	24,529	32	14,097	8,700	314,382

Note: Primary schools include junior basic schools; middle schools, high schools and higher secondary schools include madrasahs; technical schools include junior technical schools, junior government polytechnics, industrial technical institutes, industrial training centres, nursing training institutes etc.; technical and professional colleges include engineering colleges, medical colleges, para-medical institutes, management colleges, teachers training and nursing training colleges, law colleges, art colleges, music colleges etc. Special and non-formal education centres include sishu siksha kendras, madhyamik siksha kendras, adult high schools, centres of Rabindra mukta vidyalaya, recognised Sanskrit tols, institutions for the blind and other handicapped persons, Anganwadi centres, reformatory schools etc.

The following institutions are located in Kharagpur subdivision:

- Indian Institute of Technology at Kharagpur was established in 1951.
- Kharagpur College at Kharagpur was established in 1949.
- Keshiary Government College at Keshiary established in 2015.
- Hijli College at Hijli was established in 1995.
- Government General Degree College, Kharagpur-II at Ambigere, Madpur, in Kharagpur II CD Block was established in 2015.
- Belda College was established in 1963 at Belda.
- Debra Thana Sahid Kshudiram Smriti Mahavidyalaya was established in 2006 at Gangaram Chak.
- Pingla Thana Mahavidyalaya was established in 1965 at Maligram.
- Bhatter College was established in 1963 at Dantan.
- Sabang Sajani Kanta Mahavidyalaya at Lutunia was established in 1970.
- Government General Degree College, Dantan-II was established at Kashmuli in 2015.
- Government General Degree College, Mohanpur was established in 2015.
- Government General Degree College, Narayangarh was established in 2017 at Narayangarh.

== Healthcare ==
The table below (all data in numbers) presents an overview of the subdivision-wise medical facilities available and patients treated, after the separation of Jhargram, in the hospitals, health centres and sub-centres in 2014 in Paschim Medinipur district.

Subdivision	Health & Family Welfare Deptt, WB				Other State Govt Deptts	Local bodies	Central Govt Deptts / PSUs	NGO / Private Nursing Homes	Total	Total Number of Beds	Total Number of Doctors	Indoor Patients	Outdoor Patients
Subdivision	Hospitals	Rural Hospitals	Block Primary Health Centres	Primary Health Centres	Other State Govt Deptts	Local bodies	Central Govt Deptts / PSUs	NGO / Private Nursing Homes	Total	Total Number of Beds	Total Number of Doctors	Indoor Patients	Outdoor Patients
Medinipur Sadar	2	5	1	15	3	-	1	26	53	2,117	323	121,486	1,375,817
Kharagpur	2	8	2	27	2	1	2	54	98	1841	197	93,110	1,814,309
Ghatal	1	4	1	15	-	-	-	46	67	988	66	46,006	742,984
Paschim Medinipur district	5	17	24	77	5	1	3	126	208	4,946	586*	260,602	3,933,110

- Excluding Nursing Homes

=== Medical facilities ===
Medical facilities in the Kharagpur subdivision are as follows:

Hospitals: (Name, location, beds)

- Kharagpur Subdivisional Hospital, Kharagpur (M), 286 beds
- Kharagpur Railway Hospital, Kharagpur, 394 beds
- B.C.Roy Technology Hospital (IIT), Kharagpur, 35 beds
- Kharagpur E.F.R. Hospital, Kharagpur, 75 beds
- State Medical Unit, Kharagpur, 10 beds
- IPP VIII, Kharagpur, 10 beds

Rural Hospitals: (Name, CD block, location, beds)

- Hijli Rural Hospital, Kharagpur I CD block, Hijli, 60 beds
- Sabang Rural Hospital, Sabang CD block, Sabang, 40 beds
- Debra Rural Hospital, Debra CD block, Debra Bazar, 40 beds
- Belda Rural Hospital, Narayangarh CD block, Belda, 60 beds
- Bagda (Mohanpur) Rural Hospital, Mohanpur CD block, Mohanpur, 30 beds
- Pingla Rural Hospital, Pingla CD block, Pingla, 30 beds
- Keshiary Rural Hospital, Keshiari CD block, Keshiary, 30 beds
- Khandrui Rural Hospital, Dantan II CD block, Khandrui, PO Turkagarh, 30 beds

Block Primary Health Centres: (Name, CD block, location, beds)

- Changual Block Primary Health Centre, Kharagpur II CD block, Changual, 10 beds
- Dantan Block Primary Health Centre, Dantan I CD block, Dantan, 10 beds

Primary Health Centres : (CD block-wise)(CD block, PHC location, beds)

- Kharagpur I CD block: Khemasuli (4), Amba (PO Shyamraipur) (2), Khelar (PO Banpatna) (10)
- Kharagpur II CD block: Gokulpur (PO Bar Gokulpur) (6), Paparara (10)
- Sabang CD block: Mohor (10), Kharika (10), Uchitpur (4)
- Narayangarh CD block: Barakalonki (6), Radhanagar (6), Makrampur (10), Begunia (?)
- Mohanpur CD block: Sautia (6), Ghatsandhya (PO Begunia) (10)
- Debra CD block: Satyapur (PO Marotala) (6), Pasang (10), Trilochanpur (PO Sijgeria) (6), Kankra Shibrampur (PO Kankra Ataram) (6)
- Pingla CD block: Jalchak (10), Harma (PO Gobardhanpur) (6), Boalia (PO Dhaneswarpur) (6)
- Keshiary CD block: Patharhuri (PO Binandapur (6), Khajrabari (PO Khejurkuthi) (10), Ganasarisa (2)
- Dantan I CD block: Bhuringi (PO Anikole) (2), Rajnagar (10)
- Dantan II CD block: Sabradhaneswarpur (PO Khakurda) (4), Payan (PO Garh Haripur) (10)

== Electoral constituencies ==
Lok Sabha (parliamentary) and Vidhan Sabha (state assembly) constituencies in Paschim Medinipur district were as follows from 2006:

Lok Sabha constituency	Vidhan Sabha constituency	Reservation	CD Block and/or Gram panchayats
Jhargram (ST)	Garbeta	None	Garhbeta I CD Block and Amlasuli, Jogardanga, Piyasala and Sarboth GPs of Garhbeta II CD Block.
	Salboni	None	Bhimpur, Bishnupur, Debgram, Lalgeria and Salboni GPs of Salboni CD Block, Goaltor, Gohaldanga, Jeerapara, Makli, Patharpara and Pingbani GPs of Garhbeta II CD Block and Garhbeta III CD Block.
	Other assembly segments outside the district		
Medinipur	Egra	None	Egra municipality, Egra I CD Block, and Basudevpur, Deshbandhu, Dubda, Manjusree, Paniparul, Sarbaday and Bibekananda GPs of Egra II CD Block in Purba Medinipur district.
	Dantan	None	Dantan II and Mohanpur CD Blocks, and Chak Islampur GP of Dantan I CD Block.
	Keshiary	ST	Keshiari CD Block, and Alikosha, Angua, Ainkola, Dantan I, Dantan II, Monoharpur, Salikotha and Tararui GPs of Dantan I CD Block.
	Kharagpur Sadar	None	Kharagpur municipality and Kharagpur Railway Settlement of Kharagpur I CD Block.
	Narayangarh	None	Narayangarh
	Kharagpur	None	Kharagpur I CD Block, and Banpura, Panchkhuri I, Panchkhuri II, Pathra and Shiromoni GPs of Midnapore Sadar CD Block.
	Medinipur	None	Midnapore municipality, Chandra, Dherua, Monidaha and Tantigeria GPs of Midnapore Sadar CD Block and Bankibandh, Garhmal, Karnagarh, Kashijora and Shatpati GPs of Salboni CD Block.
Ghatal	Panskura Paschim	None	Panskura I CD Block in Purba Medinipur district.
	Sabang	None	Sabang CD Block, and Jalchak I, Jalchak II and Maligram GPs of Pingla CD Block.
	Pingla	None	Dhaneswarpur, Gobordhanpur, Jamna, Karkai, Kshirai, Kusumda and Pindurui GPs of Pingla CD Block and Kharagpur II CD Block
	Debra	None	Debra CD Block
	Daspur	None	Daspur II, and Basudevpur, Daspur I, Daspur II, Nandanpur I, Nandanpur II and Panchberia GPs of Daspur I CD Block.
	Ghatal	SC	Ghatal municipality, Ghatal CD Block, Khara municipality, and Rajnagar, Sarberia I and Sarberia II GPs of Daspur I CD Block.
	Keshpur	SC	Keshpur CD Block.

== Notable people ==
- Muhammad Momtaz, inaugural MLA of Kharagpur
- Sheikh Najmul Haque, six-time MLA of Kharagpur
- Sheikh Siraj Ali, two-time MLA of Kharagpur
