= Chaulia =

- Census Town
- Location in West Bengal, India Chaulia (India)
- Coordinates: 21.940541°N 87.294376°E
- Country: India
- State: West Bengal
- District: Paschim Medinipur

Area
  - Total: 5.2791 km^{2} (2.0383 sq mi)

Population (2011)
  - Total: 6,186
  - Density: 1,172/km^{2} (3,035/sq mi)

Languages
  - Official: Bengali, English
- Time zone: UTC+5:30 (IST)
- PIN: 721426
- Telephone/STD code: 03229
- Lok Sabha constituency: Medinipur
- Vidhan Sabha constituency: Keshiary
- Website: paschimmedinipur.gov.in

Chaulia is a census town in the Dantan I CD block in the Kharagpur subdivision of the Paschim Medinipur district in the state of West Bengal, India.

== Geography ==
Cities and towns in the southern portion of Kharagpur subdivision (including Dantan I & II, Mohanpur, Keshiary, Narayangarh and Sabang CD blocks) of Paschim Medinipur district
CT: census town, R: rural/ urban centre, H: historical/ religious centre
Owing to space constraints in the small map, the actual locations in a larger map may vary slightly

=== Location ===
Chaulia is located at 22.940541°N 87.294376°E.

=== Area overview ===
Kharagpur subdivision, shown partly in the map alongside, mostly has alluvial soils, except in two CD blocks in the west – Kharagpur I and Keshiary, which mostly have lateritic soils. Around 74% of the total cultivated area is cropped more than once. With a density of population of 787 per km^{2}nearly half of the district's population resides in this subdivision. 14.33% of the population lives in urban areas and 86.67% lives in the rural areas.

Note: The map alongside presents some of the notable locations in the subdivision. All places marked in the map are linked in the larger full screen map.

== Demographics ==
At the 2011 Census of India, Chaulia had a population of 6,186, of which 3,135 (51%) were males and 3,051 (49%) were females. There were 718 persons in the age range of 0–6 years. The total number of literate persons in Chaulia was 4,017 (73.46% of the population over 6 years).

== Infrastructure ==
According to the District Census Handbook 2011, Paschim Medinipur, Chaulia covered an area of 5.2791 km^{2}. Among the civic amenities, it had 24 km roads with open drains, the protected water supply involved tap water from untreated sources, borewell, tubewell. It had 892 domestic electric connections, 10 road lighting points. Among the medical facilities, it had 5 charitable hospitals/ nursing homes and 53 medicine shops. Among the educational facilities, there were 6 primary schools, 2 middle schools, 2 secondary schools, 1 senior secondary school. It had 1 recognised shorthand, typewriting and vocational training institute. Among the social, recreational and cultural facilities, it had 1 auditorium/community hall, 1 public library, 1 reading room. An important commodity it produced was paddy. It had branch offices of 2 nationalised banks, 1 cooperative bank, and 1 agricultural credit society.
