= Satkul =

Satkul Satkui
- Village
- Location in West Bengal, India Satkul (India)
- Coordinates: 22°22′29.3″N 87°20′30.5″E
- Country: India
- State: West Bengal
- District: Paschim Medinipur

Population (2011)
  - Total: 3,559

Languages*
  - Official: Bengali, Santali, English
- Time zone: UTC+5:30 (IST)
- Lok Sabha constituency: Medinipur
- Vidhan Sabha constituency: Kharagpur
- Website: paschimmedinipur.gov.in

Satkul (also referred to as Satkui) is a village, in the Kharagpur I CD block in the Kharagpur subdivision of the Paschim Medinipur district in the state of West Bengal, India.

== Geography ==
Cities and towns in the northern part of Kharagpur subdivision (including Khararagpur I & II, Debra and Pingla CD blocks) of Paschim Medinipur district
M: municipal city/ town, CT: census town, R: rural/ urban centre, H: historical/ religious centre, F: facilities
Owing to space constraints in the small map, the actual locations in a larger map may vary slightly

=== Location ===
Satkul is located at 22°22′29.3″N 87°20′30.5″E.

=== Area overview ===
Kharagpur subdivision, shown partly in the map alongside, mostly has alluvial soils, except in two CD blocks in the west – Kharagpur I and Keshiary, which mostly have lateritic soils. Around 74% of the total cultivated area is cropped more than once. With a density of population of 787 per km^{2}nearly half of the district’s population resides in this subdivision. 14.33% of the population lives in urban areas and 86.67% lives in the rural areas.

Note: The map alongside presents some of the notable locations in the subdivision. All places marked in the map are linked in the larger full screen map.

== Demographics ==
As per 2011 Census of India Satkul had a total population of 3,559 of which 1,831 (51%) were males and 1,768 (49%) were females. Population below 6 years was 578. The total number of literates in Satkul was 2,336 (64.91% of the population over 6 years).

.* For language details see Kharagpur I#Language and religion

== Civic administration ==
=== CD block HQ ===
The headquarters of Kharagpur I CD block are located at Satkul.

== Transport ==
NH 14 connecting Morgram (in Murshidabad district) and Kharagpur (in Paschim Medinipur district) passes through Satkul.
