= Madpur =

- Village
- Location in West Bengal, India Madpur (India)
- Coordinates: 22°22′54.7″N 87°26′23.2″E
- Country: India
- State: West Bengal
- District: Paschim Medinipur

Population (2011)
  - Total: 3,210

Languages*
  - Official: Bengali, Santali, English
- Time zone: UTC+5:30 (IST)
- Lok Sabha constituency: Pingla
- Vidhan Sabha constituency: Pingla
- Website: paschimmedinipur.gov.in

Madpur is a village in the Kharagpur II CD block in the Kharagpur subdivision of the Paschim Medinipur district in the state of West Bengal, India.

== Geography ==
Cities and towns in the northern part of Kharagpur subdivision (including Khararagpur I & II, Debra and Pingla CD blocks) of Paschim Medinipur district
M: municipal city/ town, CT: census town, R: rural/ urban centre, H: historical/ religious centre, F: facilities
Owing to space constraints in the small map, the actual locations in a larger map may vary slightly

=== Location ===
Madpur is located at22°22′54.7″N 87°26′23.2″E.

=== Area overview ===
Kharagpur subdivision, shown partly in the map alongside, mostly has alluvial soils, except in two CD blocks in the west – Kharagpur I and Keshiary, which mostly have lateritic soils. Around 74% of the total cultivated area is cropped more than once. With a density of population of 787 per km^{2} nearly half of the district's population resides in this subdivision. 14.33% of the population lives in urban areas and 86.67% lives in the rural areas.

Note: The map alongside presents some of the notable locations in the subdivision. All places marked in the map are linked in the larger full screen map.

== Demographics ==
As per 2011 Census of India Madpur had a total population of 3,210 of which 1,617 (50%) were males and 1,593 (50%) were females. Population below 6 years was 327. The total number of literates in Madpur was 2,351 (73.24% of the population over 6 years).

.* For language details see Kharagpur II#Language and religion

== Civic administration ==
=== CD Block HQ ===
The headquarters of Kharagpur II Block are located at Madpur.

== Transport ==
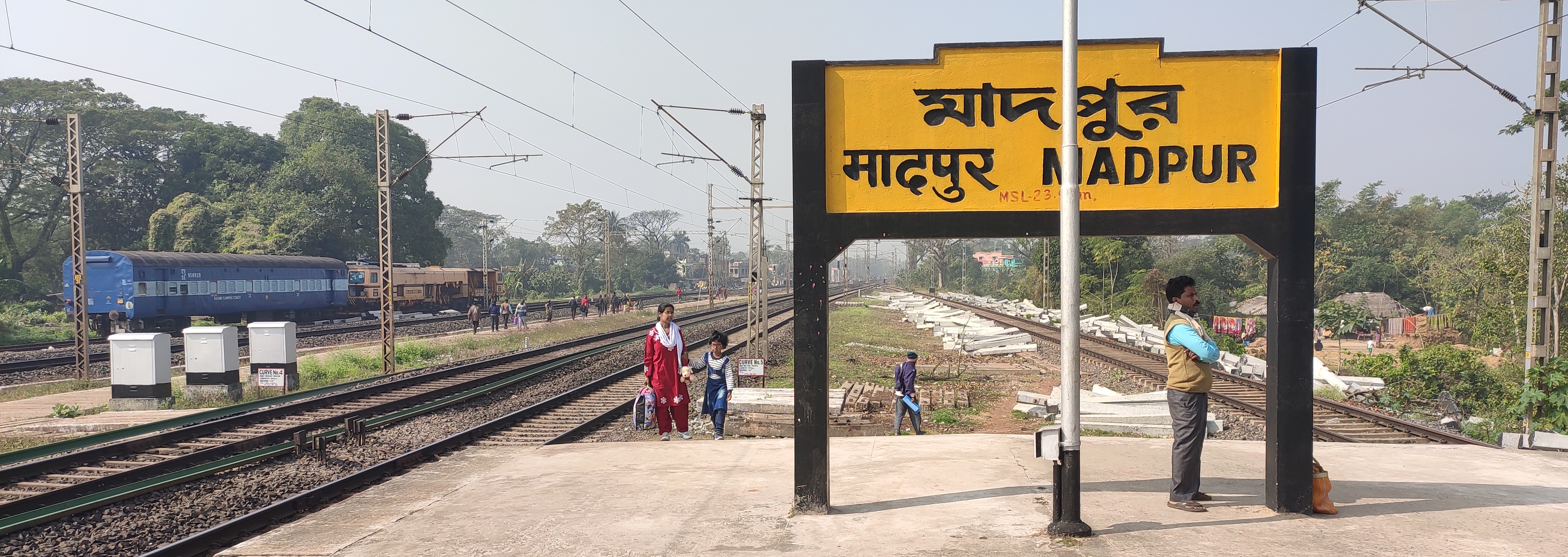
Madpur railway station

Madpur is a station on the Howrah-Kharagpur line of South Eastern Railway.

== Education ==
Government General Degree College, Kharagpur-II at Ambigere, Madpur, in Kharagpur II CD Block was established in 2015.
