= Dantan II =

- Community development block
- Coordinates: 21.8912910°N 87.3756410°E
- Country: India
- State: West Bengal
- District: Paschim Medinipur

Government
  - Type: Federal democracy

Area
  - Total: 185.56 km^{2} (71.65 sq mi)
- Elevation: 24 m (79 ft)

Population (2011)
  - Total: 155,017
  - Density: 835.40/km^{2} (2,163.7/sq mi)

Languages
  - Official: Bengali, English
- Time zone: UTC+5:30 (IST)
- PIN: 721445 (Khakurda)
- Telephone/STD code: 03229
- Vehicle registration: WB-34
- Literacy: 82.45%
- Lok Sabha constituency: Medinipur
- Vidhan Sabha constituency: Dantan
- Website: paschimmedinipur.gov.in

Dantan II is a community development block that forms an administrative division in the Kharagpur subdivision of Paschim Medinipur district in the Indian state of West Bengal.

== History ==
Archaeological excavations at Moghalmari have revealed the existence of a 6th century Buddhist monastery.

== Geography ==
The Danatan area is a monotonous rice plain with numerous waterways and tidal creeks intersecting it. The tidal creeks are lined with embankments to prevent flooding of the fields. Much of the area is water-logged. In Dantan II CD block 100% of the cultivated area has highly productive alluvial soil.

Jankapur, a constituent panchayat of Dantan II block, is located at 21°53′29″N 87°22′32″E.

Dantan II CD block is bounded by Narayangarh CD Block in the north, Patashpur II and Egra I CD blocks, in Purba Medinipur district, in the east, Mohanpur CD Block in the south and Dantan I CD block, in the west.

It is located 58 km from Midnapore, the district headquarters.

Dantan II CD block has an area of 185.56 km^{2}. It has 1 panchayat samity, 7 gram panchayats, 114 gram sansads (village councils), 128 mouzas and 118 inhabited villages. Belda police station serves this block. Headquarters of this CD block is at Dhaneswarpur.

Gram panchayats of Dantan II block/ panchayat samiti are: Haripur, Jankapur, Porolda, Sabra, Sauri-Kotbar, Talda and Turka.

== Demographics ==
=== Population ===
According to the 2011 Census of India, Dantan II CD block had a total population of 155,017, all of which were rural. There were 79,543 (51%) males and 75,474 (49%) females. Population in the age range 0–6 years was 17,923. Scheduled Castes numbered 13,828 (8.92%) and Scheduled Tribes numbered 10,861 (7.01%).

As per the 2001 census, Dantan II block had a total population of 134,347, out of which 68,738 were males and 65,609 were females. Dantan II block registered a population growth of 17.01 per cent during the 1991-2001 decade. Decadal growth for the combined Midnapore district was 14.87 per cent. Decadal growth in West Bengal was 17.45 per cent.

Large villages (with 4,000+ population) in Dantan II CD block are (2011 census figures in brackets): Turkakashba (5,608), Khandrui (6,014), Sabra (16,280) and Palasi (4,463).

Other villages in Dantan II CD block include (2011 census figures in brackets): Taldaratan Chak (2,578), Janakpur (3,418) and Purulda (3,586).

=== Literacy ===
According to the 2011 census, the total number of literate persons in Dantan II CD block was 113,040 (82.45% of the population over 6 years) out of which males numbered 62,675 (89.07% of the male population over 6 years) and females numbered 50,365 (75.48% of the female population over 6 years). The gender gap in literacy rates was 13.59%.

See also – List of West Bengal districts ranked by literacy rate

Literacy in CD blocks of
Paschim Medinipur district
Jhargram subdivision
Binpur I – 69.74%
Binpur II – 70.46%
Gopiballavpur I – 65.44%
Gopiballavpur II – 71.40%
Jamboni – 72.63%
Jhargram – 72.23%
Nayagram – 63.70%
Sankrail – 73.35%
Medinipur Sadar subdivision
Garhbeta I – 72.21%
Garhbeta II – 75.87%
Garhbeta III – 73.42%
Keshpur – 77.88%
Midnapore Sadar – 70.48%
Salboni – 74.87%
Ghatal subdivision
Chandrakona I – 78.93%
Chandrakona II – 75.96%
Daspur I – 83.99%
Daspur II – 85.62%
Ghatal – 81.08%
Kharagpur subdivision
Dantan I – 73.53%
Dantan II – 82.45%
Debra – 82.03%
Keshiari – 76.78%
Kharagpur I – 77.06%
Kharagpur II – 76.08%
Mohanpur – 80.51%
Narayangarh – 78.31%
Pingla – 83.57%
Sabang – 86.84%
2011 Census: CD Block Wise

Primary Census Abstract Data

=== Language and religion ===
Religion in Dantan II CD block (2011)
Hinduism	82.53%
Islam	17.06%
Other or not stated	0.41%

In the 2011 census Hindus numbered 127,932 and formed 82.53% of the population in Dantan II CD block. Muslims numbered 26,451 and formed 17.06% of the population. Others numbered 634 and formed 0.41% of the population. Others include Addi Bassi, Marang Boro, Santal, Saranath, Sari Dharma, Sarna, Alchchi, Bidin, Sant, Saevdharm, Seran, Saran, Sarin, Kheria, Christian and other religious communities. In 2001, Hindus were 83.93% and Muslims 15.76% of the population respectively.

Languages of Dantan II CD block (2011)
1. Bengali (86.7%)
2. Khortha (4.70%)
3. Santali (4.20%)
4. Hindi (3.28%)
5. Others (1.14%)

At the time of the 2011 census, 86.68% of the population spoke Bengali, 4.70% Khortha, 4.20% Santali and 3.28% Hindi as their first language.

== BPL families ==
In Dantan II CD block 46.97% families were living below poverty line in 2007.

According to the District Human Development Report of Paschim Medinipur: The 29 CD blocks of the district were classified into four categories based on the poverty ratio. Nayagram, Binpur II and Jamboni CD blocks have very high poverty levels (above 60%). Kharagpur I, Kharagpur II, Sankrail, Garhbeta II, Pingla and Mohanpur CD blocks have high levels of poverty (50-60%), Jhargram, Midnapore Sadar, Dantan I, Gopiballavpur II, Binpur I, Dantan II, Keshiari, Chandrakona I, Gopiballavpur I, Chandrakona II, Narayangarh, Keshpur, Ghatal, Sabang, Garhbeta I, Salboni, Debra and Garhbeta III CD blocks have moderate levels of poverty (25-50%) and Daspur II and Daspur I CD blocks have low levels of poverty (below 25%).

== Economy ==
=== Infrastructure ===
118 or 92% of mouzas in Dantan II CD block were electrified by 31 March 2014.

119 mouzas in Dantan II CD block had drinking water facilities in 2013-14. There were 127 fertiliser depots, 130 seed stores and 32 fair price shops in the CD Block.

=== Agriculture ===
Persons engaged in agriculture
in Dantan II CD block
1. Bargadars (4.41%)
2. Patta holders (22.6%)
3. Small farmers (2.40%)
4. Marginal farmers (27.1%)
5. Agricultural labourers (43.5%)

Although the Bargadari Act of 1950 recognised the rights of bargadars to a higher share of crops from the land that they tilled, it was not fully implemented. Large tracts, beyond the prescribed limit of land ceiling, remained with the rich landlords. From 1977 onwards major land reforms took place in West Bengal. Land in excess of land ceiling was acquired and distributed amongst the peasants. Following land reforms, land ownership pattern has undergone transformation. In 2013-14, persons engaged in agriculture in Dantan II CD block could be classified as follows: bargadars 4.41%, patta (document) holders 22.58%, small farmers (possessing land between 1 and 2 hectares) 2.40%, marginal farmers (possessing land up to 1 hectare) 27.13% and agricultural labourers 43.48%.

In 2005-06 the net cropped area in Dantan II CD block was 15,587 hectares out of the total geographical area of 18,430 hectares and the area in which more than one crop was grown was 10,827 hectares.

The extension of irrigation has played a role in growth of the predominant agricultural economy. In 2013-14, the total area irrigated in Dantan II CD block was 7,040 hectares, out of which 15 hectares were irrigated by canal water, 225 hectares by tank water, 1,050 hectares by deep tubewells and 5,750 hectares by shallow tubewells.

In 2013-14, Dantan II CD block produced 41,760 tonnes of Aman paddy, the main winter crop, from 21,217 hectares, 55 tonnes of Aus paddy (summer crop) from 27 hectares, 36,602 tonnes of Boro paddy (spring crop) from 9,146 hectares and 110,309 tonnes of sugar cane from 500 hectares. It also produced oilseeds.

=== Banking ===
In 2013-14, Dantan II CD block had offices of 5 commercial banks and 2, co-operative bank 5 gramin banks.

== Transport ==
Dantan II CD block has 2 originating/ terminating bus routes. The nearest railway station is 12 km from the CD block headquarters.

== Education ==
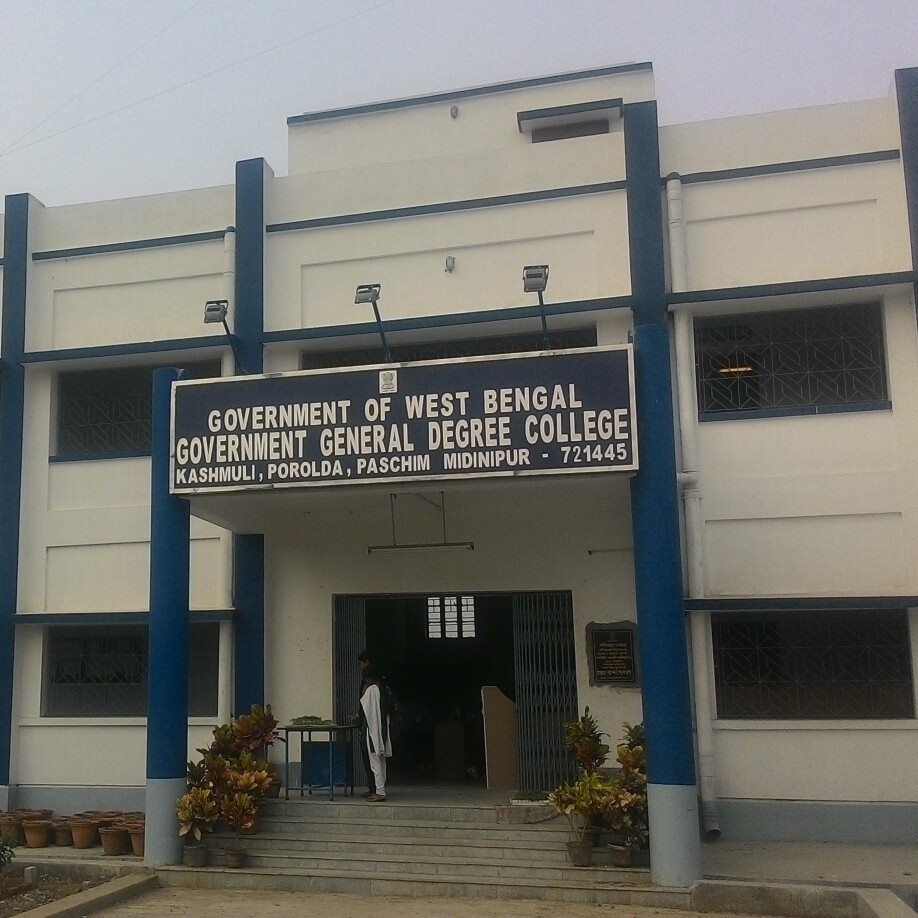
Kasmuli College

In 2013-14, Dantan II CD block had 92 primary schools with 8,940 students, 7 middle schools with 815 students, 8 high schools with 3,707 students and 12 higher secondary schools with 13,508 students. Dantan II CD block had 254 institutions for special and non-formal education with 9,573 students.

The United Nations Development Programme considers the combined primary and secondary enrolment ratio as the simple indicator of educational achievement of the children in the school going age. The infrastructure available is important. In Dantan II CD block out of the total 92 primary schools in 2008-2009, 17 had pucca buildings, 49 partially pucca, 3 kucha and 23 multiple type.

Government General Degree College, Dantan-II was established at Kashmuli in 2015.

== Healthcare ==
In 2014, Dantan II CD block had 1 rural hospital and 2 primary health centres with total 44 beds and 7 doctors. It had 23 family welfare sub centres and 1 family welfare centre. 4,536 patients were treated indoor and 114,423 patients were treated outdoor in the hospitals, health centres and subcentres of the CD block.

Khandrui Rural Hospital, with 30 beds at Khandrui, PO Turkagarh, is the major government medical facility in the Dantan II CD block. There are primary health centres at: Sabradhaneswarpur (PO Khakurda) (with 4 beds) and Payan (PO Garh Haripur) (with 10 beds).
