= Mohanpur (community development block) =

- Community development block
- Coordinates: 21.83856°N 87.43145°E
- Country: India
- State: West Bengal
- District: Paschim Medinipur

Government
  - Type: Federal democracy

Area
  - Total: 137.49 km^{2} (53.09 sq mi)
- Elevation: 17 m (56 ft)

Population (2011)
  - Total: 111,901
  - Density: 813.88/km^{2} (2,108.0/sq mi)

Languages
  - Official: Bengali, English
- Time zone: UTC+5:30 (IST)
- PIN: 721436 (Mohanpur)
- Telephone/STD code: 03229
- ISO 3166 code: IN-WB
- Vehicle registration: WB-34
- Literacy: 80.51%
- Lok Sabha constituency: Medinipur
- Vidhan Sabha constituency: Dantan
- Website: paschimmedinipur.gov.in

Mohanpur is a community development block that forms an administrative division in the Kharagpur subdivision of Paschim Medinipur district in the Indian state of West Bengal.

== Geography ==
The Mohanpur area is a monotonous rice plain with numerous waterways and tidal creeks intersecting it. The tidal creeks are lined with embankments to prevent flooding of the fields. Much of the area is water-logged. In Mohanpur CD block 100% of the cultivated area has highly productive alluvial soil.

Mohanpur is located at 21°50′19″N 87°25′53″E.

Mohanpur CD block is bounded by Dantan II CD block in the north, Egra I CD block, in Purba Medinipur district, in the east, Jaleswar CD block/ tehsil, in Balasore district in Odisha, in the south and Dantan I CD block, in the west.

It is located around 79 km from Midnapore, district headquarters through the shortest route (via Renjura-Keotkhalisa) and around 90 km through the longest route (via Egra).

Mohanpur CD block has an area of 137.49 km^{2}. It has 1 panchayat samity, 5 gram panchayats, 182 gram sansads (village councils), 103 mouzas and 100 inhabited villages. Mohanpur police station serves this block. Headquarters of this CD block is at Mohanpur.

Gram panchayats of Mohanpur block/ panchayat samiti are: Mohanpur(G.P. No-3), Nilda(G.P. No-4), Sautiya(G.P. No-1), Siyalsai(G.P. No-2) and Tanuya(G.P. No-5).

General elections to the first Lok Sabha since independence were held in India were held between 25 October 1951 and 21 February 1952. Mohanpur was a Vidhan Sabha constituency in 1951. The seat was won by Basanta Kumar Panigrahi of Bharatiya Jana Sangha.

== Demographics ==
=== Population ===
According to the 2011 Census of India, Mohanpur CD block had a population of 111,901, all of which were rural. There were 57,558 (51%) males and 54,343 (49%) females. Population in the age range 0–6 years was 12,644. Scheduled Castes numbered 11,525 (10.30%) and Scheduled Tribes numbered 6,026 (5.39%).

According to the 2001 census, Mohanpur block had a population of 96,315, out of which 49,111 were males and 47,204 females. Mohanpur block registered a population growth of 14.95 per cent during the 1991-2001 decade. Decadal growth for the combined Midnapore district was 14.87 per cent. Decadal growth in West Bengal was 17.45 per cent.

Large villages (with 4,000+ population) in Mohanpur CD block are (2011 census figures in brackets): Mohanpur (6,049), Sautia (4,097) and Tanuya (5,352).

Other villages in Mohanpur CD block include (2011 census figures in brackets): Nilda (2,786) and Siyalsai (2,302). jarisai

=== Literacy ===
According to the 2011 census, the total number of literate persons in Mohanpur CD block was 79,913 (80.51% of the population over 6 years) out of which males numbered 44,753 (87.65% of the male population over 6 years) and females numbered 35,160 (72.95% of the female population over 6 years). The gender gap in literacy rates was 14.70%.

See also – List of West Bengal districts ranked by literacy rate

Literacy in CD blocks of
Paschim Medinipur district
Jhargram subdivision
Binpur I – 69.74%
Binpur II – 70.46%
Gopiballavpur I – 65.44%
Gopiballavpur II – 71.40%
Jamboni – 72.63%
Jhargram – 72.23%
Nayagram – 63.70%
Sankrail – 73.35%
Medinipur Sadar subdivision
Garhbeta I – 72.21%
Garhbeta II – 75.87%
Garhbeta III – 73.42%
Keshpur – 77.88%
Midnapore Sadar – 70.48%
Salboni – 74.87%
Ghatal subdivision
Chandrakona I – 78.93%
Chandrakona II – 75.96%
Daspur I – 83.99%
Daspur II – 85.62%
Ghatal – 81.08%
Kharagpur subdivision
Dantan I – 73.53%
Dantan II – 82.45%
Debra – 82.03%
Keshiari – 76.78%
Kharagpur I – 77.06%
Kharagpur II – 76.08%
Mohanpur – 80.51%
Narayangarh – 78.31%
Pingla – 83.57%
Sabang – 86.84%
2011 Census: CD Block Wise

Primary Census Abstract Data

=== Language and religion ===
Religion in Mohanpur CD block (2011)
Hinduism	89.70%
Islam	10.21%
Other or not stated	0.09%

In the 2011 census Hindus numbered 100,376 and formed 89.70% of the population in Mohanpur CD block. Muslims numbered 11,424 and formed 10.21% of the population. Others numbered 101 and formed 0.09% of the population. Others include Addi Bassi, Marang Boro, Santal, Saranath, Sari Dharma, Sarna, Alchchi, Bidin, Sant, Saevdharm, Seran, Saran, Sarin, Kheria, Christian and other religious communities. In 2001, Hindus were 90.61% and Muslims 9.24% of the population respectively.

Languages of Mohanpur CD block (2011)
1. Bengali (83.0%)
2. Odia (5.75%)
3. Santali (4.05%)
4. Hindi (3.78%)
5. Urdu (3.36%)
6. Others (0.09%)

At the time of the 2011 census, 82.97% of the population spoke Bengali, 5.75% Odia, 4.05% Santali, 3.78% Hindi and 3.36% Urdu as their first language.

== BPL families ==
In Mohanpur CD block 50.16% families were living below poverty line in 2007.

According to the District Human Development Report of Paschim Medinipur: The 29 CD blocks of the district were classified into four categories based on the poverty ratio. Nayagram, Binpur II and Jamboni CD blocks have very high poverty levels (above 60%). Kharagpur I, Kharagpur II, Sankrail, Garhbeta II, Pingla and Mohanpur CD blocks have high levels of poverty (50-60%), Jhargram, Midnapore Sadar, Dantan I, Gopiballavpur II, Binpur I, Dantan II, Keshiari, Chandrakona I, Gopiballavpur I, Chandrakona II, Narayangarh, Keshpur, Ghatal, Sabang, Garhbeta I, Salboni, Debra and Garhbeta III CD blocks have moderate levels of poverty (25-50%) and Daspur II and Daspur I CD blocks have low levels of poverty (below 25%).

== Economy ==
=== Infrastructure ===
100 or 97% of mouzas in Mohanpur CD block were electrified by 31 March 2014.

103 mouzas in Mohanpur CD block had drinking water facilities in 2013-14. There were 74 fertiliser depots, 47 seed stores and 20 fair price shops in the CD block.

=== Agriculture ===
Persons engaged in agriculture
in Mohanpur CD block
1. Bargadars (4.16%)
2. Patta holders (21.0%)
3. Small farmers (4.08%)
4. Marginal farmers (26.7%)
5. Agricultural labourers (44.0%)

Although the Bargadari Act of 1950 recognised the rights of bargadars to a higher share of crops from the land that they tilled, it was not implemented fully. Large tracts, beyond the prescribed limit of land ceiling, remained with the rich landlords. From 1977 onwards major land reforms took place in West Bengal. Land in excess of land ceiling was acquired and distributed amongst the peasants. Following land reforms land ownership pattern has undergone transformation. In 2013-14, persons engaged in agriculture in Mohanpur CD block could be classified as follows: bargadars 4.16%, patta (document) holders 21.01%, small farmers (possessing land between 1 and 2 hectares) 4.08%, marginal farmers (possessing land up to 1 hectare) 26.71% and agricultural labourers 44.04%.

In 2005-06 the nett cropped area in Mohanpur CD block was 12,000 hectares out of the total geographical area of 13,994 hectares and the area in which more than one crop was grown was 9,327 hectares.

The extension of irrigation has played a role in growth of the predominant agricultural economy. In 2013-14, the total area irrigated in Mohanpur CD block was 5,265 hectares, out of which 300 hectares were irrigated by tank water, 1,750 hectares by deep tubewells and 3,215 hectares by shallow tubewells.

In 2013-14, Mohanpur CD block produced 21,149 tonnes of Aman paddy, the main winter crop, from 10,695 hectares and 14,397 tonnes of Boro paddy (spring crop) from 4,388 hectares. It also produced oilseeds.

=== Banking ===
In 2013-14, Mohanpur CD block had offices of 5 commercial banks and 2 gramin banks.

== Transport ==
Mohanpur CD block has 4 originating/ terminating bus routes. The nearest railway station is 22 km from the CD block headquarters.

== Education ==
In 2013-14, Mohanpur CD block had 83 primary schools with 6,890 students, 10 middle schools with 690 students, 8 high schools with 4,735 students and 6 higher secondary schools with 7,129 students. Mohanpur CD block had 190 institutions for special and non-formal education with 1,187 students.

The United Nations Development Programme considers the combined primary and secondary enrolment ratio as the simple indicator of educational achievement of the children in the school going age. The infrastructure available is important. In Mohanpur CD block out of the total 81 primary schools in 2008-2009, 39 had pucca buildings, 10 partially pucca, 1 kucha and 31 multiple type.

Government General Degree College, Mohanpur is the only college in this block.

== Healthcare ==
In 2014, Mohanpur CD block had 1 rural hospital and 2 primary health centres with total 46 beds and 4 doctors. It had 36 family welfare sub centres and 1 family welfare centre. 3,473 patients were treated indoor and 71,771 patients were treated outdoor in the hospitals, health centres and subcentres of the CD block.

Bagda (Mohanpur) Rural Hospital, with 30 beds at Mohanpur, is the major government medical facility in the Mohanpur CD block. There are primary health centres at: Sautia (with 6 beds) and Ghatsandhya (PO Begunia) (with 10 beds).
