= Mohanpur, Paschim Medinipur =

Mohanpur
- Village, Block
- Location in West Bengal, India Mohanpur (India)
- Coordinates: 21°50′33.0″N 87°25′17.2″E
- Country: India
- State: West Bengal
- District: Paschim Medinipur

Population (2011)
  - Total: 6,049

Languages
  - Official: Bengali, English
- Time zone: UTC+5:30 (IST)
- PIN: 721436 (Mohanpur)
- Telephone/STD code: 03229
- Lok Sabha constituency: Medinipur
- Vidhan Sabha constituency: Dantan
- Website: paschimmedinipur.gov.in

Mohanpur is a village in the Mohanpur CD block in the Kharagpur subdivision of the Paschim Medinipur district in the state of West Bengal, India.

== Geography ==
Cities and towns in the southern portion of Kharagpur subdivision (including Dantan I & II, Mohanpur, Keshiary, Narayangarh and Sabang CD blocks) of Paschim Medinipur district
CT: census town, R: rural/ urban centre, H: historical/ religious centre
Owing to space constraints in the small map, the actual locations in a larger map may vary slightly

=== Location ===
Mohanpur is located at 21°50′33.0″N 87°25′17.2″E.

=== Area overview ===
kharagpur subdivision, shown partly in the map alongside, mostly has alluvial soils, except in two CD blocks in the west – Kharagpur I and Keshiary, which mostly have lateritic soils. Around 74% of the total cultivated area is cropped more than once. With a density of population of 787 per km^{2}nearly half of the district’s population resides in this subdivision. 14.33% of the population lives in urban areas and 86.67% lives in the rural areas.

Note: The map alongside presents some of the notable locations in the subdivision. All places marked in the map are linked in the larger full screen map.

== Demographics ==
According to the 2011 Census of India Mohanpur had a total population of 6,049 of which 3,093 (51%) were males and 2,956 (49%) were females. Population in the age range 0–6 years was 613. The total number of literate persons in Mohanpur was 4,306 (71.19% of the population over 6 years).

== Civic administration ==
=== CD block HQ ===
The headquarters of Mohanpur CD block are located at Mohanpur.

=== Police station ===
Mohanpur police station has jurisdiction over Mohanpur CD block.

== Transport ==
The Egra-Solpatta Road passes through Mohanpur.
