= Chandra, Paschim Medinipur =

Chandra
- Village
- Location in West Bengal, India Chandra (India)
- Coordinates: 22.4646°N 87.1480°E
- Country: India
- State: West Bengal
- District: Paschim Medinipur

Population (2011)
  - Total: 675

Languages*
  - Official: Bengali, Santali, English
- Time zone: UTC+5:30 (IST)
- PIN: 721102
- Telephone/STD code: 03221
- Lok Sabha constituency: Ghatal
- Vidhan Sabha constituency: Pingla
- Website: paschimmedinipur.gov.in

Chandra is a village and a gram panchayat in the Midnapore Sadar CD block in the Medinipur Sadar subdivision of the Paschim Medinipur district in the state of West Bengal, India.

== Geography ==
Cities and towns in Medinpur Sadar subdivision of Paschim Medinipur district
M: municipal city/ town, CT: census town, R: rural/ urban centre, H: historical/ religious centre, F: facilities
Owing to space constraints in the small map, the actual locations in a larger map may vary slightly

=== Location ===
Chandra is located at 22.4646°N 87.1480°E.

=== Area overview ===
Paschim Medinipur district (before separation of Jhargram) had a total forest area of 1,700 km^{2}, accounting for 14.31% of the total forested area of the state. It is obvious from the map of the Midnapore Sadar subdivision, placed alongside, is that there are large stretches of forests in the subdivision. The soil is predominantly lateritic. Around 30% of the population of the district resides in this subdivision. 13.95% of the population lives in urban areas and 86.05% lives in the rural areas.

Note: The map alongside presents some of the notable locations in the subdivision. All places marked in the map are linked in the larger full screen map.

== Demographics ==
According to the 2011 Census of India, Chandra had a total population of 675, of which 344 (51%) were males and 331 (49%) were females.

.*For language details see Midnapore Sadar (community development block)#Language and religion

== Education ==
Chandra High School is a Bengali-medium co-educational institution established in 1949. The school has facilities for teaching from class V to class XII. It has a library with 18,401 books, 14 computers and a playground.

== Healthcare ==
Chandra (Deypara) Block Primary Health Centre, with 15 beds at Chandra, is the major government medical facility in the Midnapore Sadar CD block.
