= Dhaneswarpur =

- Village
- Location in West Bengal, India Dhaneswarpur (India)
- Coordinates: 22°00′29.5″N 87°25′03.4″E
- Country: India
- State: West Bengal
- District: Paschim Medinipur

Population (2011)
  - Total: 2,000

Languages
  - Official: Bengali, English
- Time zone: UTC+5:30 (IST)
- Lok Sabha constituency: Medinipur
- Vidhan Sabha constituency: Dantan
- Website: paschimmedinipur.gov.in

Dhaneswarpur is a village, in the Dantan II CD block in the Kharagpur subdivision of the Paschim Medinipur district in the state of West Bengal, India.

== Geography ==
Cities and towns in the southern portion of Kharagpur subdivision (including Dantan I & II, Mohanpur, Keshiary, Narayangarh and Sabang CD blocks) of Paschim Medinipur district
CT: census town, R: rural/ urban centre, H: historical/ religious centre
Owing to space constraints in the small map, the actual locations in a larger map may vary slightly

=== Location ===
Dhaneswarpur is located at 22°00′29.5″N 87°25′03.4″E.

=== Area overview ===
Kharagpur subdivision, shown partly in the map alongside, mostly has alluvial soils, except in two CD blocks in the west – Kharagpur I and Keshiary, which mostly have lateritic soils. Around 74% of the total cultivated area is cropped more than once. With a density of population of 787 per km^{2} nearly half of the district's population resides in this subdivision. 14.33% of the population lives in urban areas and 86.67% lives in the rural areas.

Note: The map alongside presents some of the notable locations in the subdivision. All places marked in the map are linked in the larger full screen map.

== Demographics ==
As per 2011 Census of India Dhaneswarpur had a total population of 2,000 of which 1,020 (51%) were males and 98 (49%) were females. Population below 6 years was 199. The total number of literates in Dhaneswarpur was 1,341 (67.05% of the population over 6 years).

== Civic administration ==
=== CD block HQ ===
The headquarters of Dantan II CD block are located at Dhaneswarpur.

== Transport ==
SH 5 connecting Rupnarayanpur (in Bardhaman district) and Junput (in Purba Medinipur district) passes through Dhaneswarpur.
