= Kharagpur I =

- Community development block
- Coordinates: 22.3088000°N 87.2278370°E
- Country: India
- State: West Bengal
- District: Paschim Medinipur

Government
  - Type: Federal democracy

Area
  - Total: 313.31 km^{2} (120.97 sq mi)
- Elevation: 62 m (203 ft)

Population (2011)
  - Total: 258,040
  - Density: 823.59/km^{2} (2,133.1/sq mi)

Languages
  - Official: Bengali, Santali, English
- Time zone: UTC+5:30 (IST)
- PIN: 721301 (Old Kharagpur); 721304 (Nimpura)
- Telephone/STD code: 03221
- Vehicle registration: WB-34
- Literacy: 77.06%
- Lok Sabha constituency: Medinipur
- Vidhan Sabha constituency: Kharagpur
- Website: paschimmedinipur.gov.in

Kharagpur I is a community development block that forms an administrative division in the Kharagpur subdivision of Paschim Medinipur district in the Indian state of West Bengal. It is located 14 km from Midnapore, the district headquarters.

== Geography ==
In Kharagpur I CD block, 60% of the cultivated area has lateritic soil and 40% has alluvial soil.

Hariatara, a constituent panchayat of Kharagpur I block, is located at 22°18′32″N 87°13′40″E.

Kharagpur I CD block is bounded by Midnapore Sadar CD block in the north, Kharagpur II CD block in the east, Nayagram and Keshiari CD blocks in the south and Sankrail and Jhargram CD locks in the west.

Kharagpur I CD block has an area of 313.31 km^{2}. It has 1 panchayat samity, 7 gram panchayats, 112 gram sansads (village councils), 269 mouzas and 228 inhabited villages. Kharagpur (Local) police station serves this block. Headquarters of this CD block is at Satkul.

Kharagpur I CD block had a forest cover of 4,000 hectares, against a total geographical area of 32,600 hectares in 2005–06.

Gram panchayats of Kharagpur I block/ panchayat samiti are: Arjuni, Barkola, Bhetia, Gopali, Hariatara, Kalaikunda and Khelar.

== Demographics ==
=== Population ===
According to the 2011 Census of India, Kharagpur I CD block had a population of 258,040, of which 165,961 were rural and 92,079 were urban. There were 131,073 (51%) males and 126,967 (49%) females. Population in the age range 0–6 years was 28,677. Scheduled Castes numbered 46,431 (17.99%) and Scheduled Tribes numbered 42,453 (16.45%).

According to the 2001 census, Kharagpur I block had a total population of 241,420, out of which 123,827 were males and 117,593 were females. Kharagpur I block registered a population growth of 17.24 per cent during the 1991-2001 decade. Decadal growth for the combined Midnapore district was 14.87 per cent. Decadal growth in West Bengal was 17.45 per cent.

Census Towns in Kharagpur I CD block are (2011 census figures in brackets): Kharagpur Railway Settlement (82,735) and Kalaikunda (9,344).

Large villages (with 4,000+ population) in Kharagpur I CD block are (2011 census figures in brackets): Barkola (5,476) and Salua (4,430),

Other villages in Kharagpur I CD block included (2011 census figures in brackets): Arjuni (3,033), Hariatara (1,598), Bhetia (2,174), Gopali (2,951) and Khelar (2,621).

=== Literacy ===
According to the 2011 census the total number of literate persons in Kharagpur I CD block was 176,744 (77.06% of the population over 6 years) out of which males numbered 98,187 (84.29% of the male population over 6 years) and females numbered 78,557 (69.60% of the female population over 6 years).The gender gap in literacy rates was 14.69%.

See also – List of West Bengal districts ranked by literacy rate

Literacy in CD blocks of
Paschim Medinipur district
Jhargram subdivision
Binpur I – 69.74%
Binpur II – 70.46%
Gopiballavpur I – 65.44%
Gopiballavpur II – 71.40%
Jamboni – 72.63%
Jhargram – 72.23%
Nayagram – 63.70%
Sankrail – 73.35%
Medinipur Sadar subdivision
Garhbeta I – 72.21%
Garhbeta II – 75.87%
Garhbeta III – 73.42%
Keshpur – 77.88%
Midnapore Sadar – 70.48%
Salboni – 74.87%
Ghatal subdivision
Chandrakona I – 78.93%
Chandrakona II – 75.96%
Daspur I – 83.99%
Daspur II – 85.62%
Ghatal – 81.08%
Kharagpur subdivision
Dantan I – 73.53%
Dantan II – 82.45%
Debra – 82.03%
Keshiari – 76.78%
Kharagpur I – 77.06%
Kharagpur II – 76.08%
Mohanpur – 80.51%
Narayangarh – 78.31%
Pingla – 83.57%
Sabang – 86.84%
2011 Census: CD Block Wise

Primary Census Abstract Data

=== Language and religion ===
Religion in Kharagpur I CD block (2011)
| Hinduism | 89.05% |
| Islam | 8.22% |
| Christianity | 1.51% |
| Other or not stated | 1.22% |

In the 2011 census Hindus numbered 229,786 and formed 89.05% of the population in Kharagpur I CD block. Muslims numbered 21,200 and formed 8.22% of the population. Christians numbered 3,899 and formed 1.51% of the population. Others numbered 3150 and formed 1.22% of the population. Others include Addi Bassi, Marang Boro, Santal, Saranath, Sari Dharma, Sarna, Alchchi, Bidin, Sant, Saevdharm, Seran, Saran, Sarin, Kheria, and other religious communities. In 2001, Hindus were 89.76%, Muslims 6.43%, Christians 1.71% and tribal religions 1.40% of the population respectively.

Languages of Kharagpur I CD block (2011)
1. Bengali (55.4%)
2. Telugu (12.8%)
3. Hindi (10.7%)
4. Santali (7.16%)
5. Odia (4.63%)
6. Nepali (2.44%)
7. Urdu (2.24%)
8. Koda (1.79%)
9. Others (2.92%)

At the time of the 2011 census, 55.39% of the population spoke Bengali, 12.78% Telugu, 10.65% Hindi, 7.16% Santali, 4.63% Odia, 2.44% Nepali, 2.24% Urdu and 1.79% Koda as their first language.

== BPL families ==
In Kharagpur I CD block 58.26% families were living below poverty line in 2007.

According to the District Human Development Report of Paschim Medinipur: The 29 CD blocks of the district were classified into four categories based on the poverty ratio. Nayagram, Binpur II and Jamboni CD blocks have very high poverty levels (above 60%). Kharagpur I, Kharagpur II, Sankrail, Garhbeta II, Pingla and Mohanpur CD blocks have high levels of poverty (50-60%), Jhargram, Midnapore Sadar, Dantan I, Gopiballavpur II, Binpur I, Dantan II, Keshiari, Chandrakona I, Gopiballavpur I, Chandrakona II, Narayangarh, Keshpur, Ghatal, Sabang, Garhbeta I, Salboni, Debra and Garhbeta III CD blocks have moderate levels of poverty (25-50%) and Daspur II and Daspur I CD blocks have low levels of poverty (below 25%).

== Economy ==
=== Infrastructure ===
230 or 86% of mouzas in Kharagpur I CD block were electrified by 31 March 2014.

231 mouzas in Kharagpur I CD block had drinking water facilities in 2013–14. There were 69 fertiliser depots, 32 seed stores and 36 fair price shops in the CD block.

=== Agriculture ===
Persons engaged in agriculture
in Kharagpur I CD block
1. Bargadars (4.77%)
2. Patta holders (35.7%)
3. Small farmers (4.15%)
4. Marginal farmers (17.8%)
5. Agricultural labourers (37.5%)

Although the Bargadari Act of 1950 recognised the rights of bargadars to a higher share of crops from the land that they tilled, it was not implemented fully. Large tracts, beyond the prescribed limit of land ceiling, remained with the rich landlords. From 1977 onwards major land reforms took place in West Bengal. Land in excess of land ceiling was acquired and distributed amongst the peasants. Following land reforms land ownership pattern has undergone transformation. In 2013–14, persons engaged in agriculture in Kharagpur I CD block could be classified as follows: bargadars 4.77%, patta (document) holders 35.74%, small farmers (possessing land between 1 and 2 hectares) 4.15%, marginal farmers (possessing land up to 1 hectare) 17.80% and agricultural labourers 37.54%.

In 2005-06 the nett cropped area in Kharagpur I CD block was 18,500 hectares and the area in which more than one crop was grown was 11,322 hectares.

The extension of irrigation has played a role in growth of the predominant agricultural economy. In 2013–14, the total area irrigated in Kharagpur I CD block was 3,256 hectares, out of which 565 hectares were irrigated by tank water, 200 hectares by deep tubewells, 1,866 hectares by shallow tubewells, 380 hectares by river lift irrigation and 20 hectares by open dug wells and 225 hectares by other methods.

In 2013–14, Kharagpur I CD block produced 107,107 tonnes of Aman paddy, the main winter crop, from 40,648 hectares, 15,624 tonnes of Aus paddy (summer crop) from 6,935 hectares, 9,668 tonnes of Boro paddy (spring crop) from 2,798 hectares and 5,602 tonnes of potatoes from 200 hectares. It also produced oilseeds.

=== Banking ===
In 2013–14, Kharagpur I CD block had offices of 40 commercial banks.

== Transport ==
Kharagpur I CD block has 1 ferry service and 28 originating/ terminating bus routes.

The Kharagpur-Tatanagar line, Kharagpur-Puri line and Kharagpur-Bankura-Adra line of South Eastern Railway pass through this CD block and there are stations at Nimpura, Kalaikunda and Giri Maidan.

== Education ==
In 2013–14, Kharagpur I CD block had 100 primary schools with 10,329 students, 8 middle schools with 743 students, 3 high schools with 1,488 students and 13 higher secondary schools with 14,686 students. Kharagpur I CD block had 1 general college with 349 students, 2 technical/ professional institutions with 200 students and 380 institutions for special and non-formal education with 1,482 students.

The United Nations Development Programme considers the combined primary and secondary enrolment ratio as the simple indicator of educational achievement of the children in the school going age. The infrastructure available is important. In Kharagpur I CD block out of the total 98 primary schools in 2008–2009, 58 had pucca buildings, 6 partially pucca and 34 multiple type.

Hijli College at Hijli was established in 1995 and is affiliated to Vidyasagar University. It offers honours courses in Bengali, English, history, geography, sociology, mathematics, computer science and chemistry.

== Healthcare ==
In 2014, Kharagpur I CD block had 1 rural hospital, 3 primary health centres, 1 state government (other than health and family welfare department) medical institution and 7 private nursing homes with total 214 beds and 19 doctors. It had 25 family welfare sub centres and 1 family welfare centre. 4,724 patients were treated indoor and 99,758 patients were treated outdoor in the hospitals, health centres and subcentres of the CD block.

Hijli Rural Hospital, with 60 beds at Hijli, is the major government medical facility in the Kharagpur I CD block. There are primary health centres at: Khemasuli (with 4 beds), Amba (PO Shyamraipur) (with 2 beds) and Khelar (PO Banpatna) (with 10 beds).
