= Kharagpur II =

- Community development block
- Coordinates: 22.3621415°N 87.4264526°E
- Country: India
- State: West Bengal
- District: Paschim Medinipur

Government
  - Type: Federal democracy

Area
  - Total: 265.63 km^{2} (102.56 sq mi)
- Elevation: 28 m (92 ft)

Population (2011)
  - Total: 183,440
  - Density: 690.58/km^{2} (1,788.6/sq mi)

Languages
  - Official: Bengali, Santali English
- Time zone: UTC+5:30 (IST)
- PIN: 721301 (Old Kharagpur)
- Telephone/STD code: 03221
- ISO 3166 code: IN-WB
- Vehicle registration: WB 34
- Literacy: 76.08%
- Lok Sabha constituency: Ghatal
- Vidhan Sabha constituency: Pingla
- Website: paschimmedinipur.gov.in

Kharagpur II is a community development block that forms an administrative division in the Kharagpur subdivision of Paschim Medinipur district in the Indian state of West Bengal. Kharagpur police station serves this block. Headquarters of this block is at Madpur.

== Geography ==
In the Kharagpur II CD block, 65% of the cultivated area has lateritic soil and 35% has alluvial soil.

Madpur, headquarters of Kharagpur II block, is located at 22°21′44″N 87°25′35″E.

Kharagpur II CD block is bounded by Midnapore Sadar CD block in the north, Debra and Pingla CD blocks in the east, Narayangarh CD block in the south and Kharagpur I CD blocks in the west.

It is located 12 km from Midnapore, the district headquarters.

Kharagpur II CD block has an area of 265.63 km^{2}. It has 1 panchayat samity, 9 gram panchayats, 129 gram sansads (village councils), 353 mouzas and 330 inhabited villages. Kharagpur (Local) police station serves this block. Headquarters of this CD block is at Madpur.

Kharagpur II CD block has a forest cover of 7 hectares. Kharagpur Forest Division is primarily a social forestry division.

Gram panchayats of Kharagpur II block/ panchayat samiti are: Chakmakrampur, Changual, Kaliara I, Kaliara II, Lachhmpur, Palsya, Paparara I, Paparara II and Sankoa-II.

== Demographics ==
=== Population ===
According to the 2011 Census of India, Kharagpur II CD block had a total population of 183,440, all of which were rural. There were 92,546 (50%) males and 90,894 (50%) females. Population below 6 years was 22,527. Scheduled Castes numbered 34,138 (18.61%) and Scheduled Tribes numbered 46,899 (25.57%).

As per the 2001 census, Kharagpur II block had a total population of 161,790, out of which 82,326 were males and 79,464 were females. Kharagpur II block registered a population growth of 18.21 per cent during the 1991-2001 decade. Decadal growth for the combined Midnapore district was 14.87 per cent. Decadal growth in West Bengal was 17.45 per cent.

Large villages (with 4,000+ population) in Kharagpur II CD block are (2011 census figures in brackets): Chakmakrampur (4,273), Papara (4,091).

Other villages in Kharagpur II CD block include (2011 census figures in brackets): Palshya (1,536), Kaliara (1,970), Sankoa (2,759), Changual (3,737) and Lachmapur (2,019).

=== Literacy ===
According to the 2011 census the total number of literate persons in Kharagpur II CD block was 122,415 (76.08% of the population over 6 years) out of which males numbered 68,212 (84.10% of the male population over 6 years) and females numbered 54,203 (67.92% of the female population over 6 years). The gender gap in literacy rates was 16.18%.

See also – List of West Bengal districts ranked by literacy rate

Literacy in CD blocks of
Paschim Medinipur district
Jhargram subdivision
Binpur I – 69.74%
Binpur II – 70.46%
Gopiballavpur I – 65.44%
Gopiballavpur II – 71.40%
Jamboni – 72.63%
Jhargram – 72.23%
Nayagram – 63.70%
Sankrail – 73.35%
Medinipur Sadar subdivision
Garhbeta I – 72.21%
Garhbeta II – 75.87%
Garhbeta III – 73.42%
Keshpur – 77.88%
Midnapore Sadar – 70.48%
Salboni – 74.87%
Ghatal subdivision
Chandrakona I – 78.93%
Chandrakona II – 75.96%
Daspur I – 83.99%
Daspur II – 85.62%
Ghatal – 81.08%
Kharagpur subdivision
Dantan I – 73.53%
Dantan II – 82.45%
Debra – 82.03%
Keshiari – 76.78%
Kharagpur I – 77.06%
Kharagpur II – 76.08%
Mohanpur – 80.51%
Narayangarh – 78.31%
Pingla – 83.57%
Sabang – 86.84%
2011 Census: CD Block Wise

Primary Census Abstract Data

=== Language and religion ===
Religion in Kharagpur II CD block (2011)
Hinduism	84.99%
Islam	12.94%
Other or not stated	0.62%

In the 2011 census Hindus numbered 155,905 and formed 84.99% of the population in Kharagpur II CD block. Muslims numbered 26,405 and formed 14.39% of the population. Others numbered 1,130 and formed 0.62% of the population. Others include Addi Bassi, Marang Boro, Santal, Saranath, Sari Dharma, Sarna, Alchchi, Bidin, Sant, Saevdharm, Seran, Saran, Sarin, Kheria, Christian and other religious communities. In 2001, Hindus were 86.81% and Muslims 12.94% of the population respectively.

Languages of Kharagpur II CD block (2011)
1. Bengali (88.2%)
2. Santali (10.5%)
3. Others (1.24%)

At the time of the 2011 census, 88.23% of the population spoke Bengali and 10.53% Santali as their first language.

== BPL families ==
In Kharagpur II CD block 53.57% families were living below poverty line in 2007.

According to the District Human Development Report of Paschim Medinipur: The 29 CD blocks of the district were classified into four categories based on the poverty ratio. Nayagram, Binpur II and Jamboni CD blocks have very high poverty levels (above 60%). Kharagpur I, Kharagpur II, Sankrail, Garhbeta II, Pingla and Mohanpur CD blocks have high levels of poverty (50-60%), Jhargram, Midnapore Sadar, Dantan I, Gopiballavpur II, Binpur I, Dantan II, Keshiari, Chandrakona I, Gopiballavpur I, Chandrakona II, Narayangarh, Keshpur, Ghatal, Sabang, Garhbeta I, Salboni, Debra and Garhbeta III CD blocks have moderate levels of poverty (25-50%) and Daspur II and Daspur I CD blocks have low levels of poverty (below 25%).

== Economy ==
=== Infrastructure ===
327 or 93% of mouzas in Kharagpur II CD block were electrified by 31 March 2014.

346 mouzas in Kharagpur II CD block had drinking water facilities in 2013-14. There were 93 fertiliser depots, 30 seed stores and 39 fair price shops in the CD block.

=== Agriculture ===
Persons engaged in agriculture
in Kharagpur II CD block
1. Bargadars (8.62%)
2. Patta holders (31.7%)
3. Small farmers (4.87%)
4. Marginal farmers (27.4%)
5. Agricultural labourers (27.4%)

Although the Bargadari Act of 1950 recognised the rights of bargadars to a higher share of crops from the land that they tilled, it was not implemented. Large tracts, beyond the prescribed limit of land ceiling, remained with the rich landlords. From 1977 onwards major land reforms took place in West Bengal. Land in excess of land ceiling was acquired and distributed amongst the peasants. Following land reforms land ownership pattern has undergone transformation. In 2013-14, persons engaged in agriculture in Kharagpur II CD block could be classified as follows: bargadars 8.62%, patta (document) holders 31.69%, small farmers (possessing land between 1 and 2 hectares) 4.87%, marginal farmers (possessing land up to 1 hectare) 27.42% and agricultural labourers 27.42%.

In 2005-06 the nett cropped area in Kharagpur II CD block was 20,440 hectares out of geographical area of 26,587 hectares and the area in which more than one crop was grown was 15,066 hectares.

The extension of irrigation has played a role in growth of the predominant agricultural economy. In 2013-14, the total area irrigated in Kharagpur II CD block was 12,566 hectares, out of which 5,000 hectares were irrigated by canals, 135 hectares by tank water, 1,600 hectares by deep tubewells, 5,225 hectares by shallow tubewells, 500 hectares by river lift irrigation and 105 hectares by other methods.

In 2013-14, Kharagpur II CD Block produced 7,841 tonnes of Aman paddy, the main winter crop, from 4,887 hectares, 2,255 tonnes of Aus paddy (summer crop) from 6,935 hectares, 12,546 tonnes of Boro paddy (spring crop) from 3,156 hectares and 71,634 tonnes of potatoes from 2,525 hectares. It also produced oilseeds.

=== Banking ===
In 2013-14, Kharagpur II CD block had offices of 6 commercial banks and 2 gramin banks.

== Transport ==
Kharagpur II CD Block has 1 ferry service and 4 originating/ terminating bus routes.

The Howrah-Kharagpur line passes through this CD block. Jakpur, Madpur and Shyam Chak are stations on this line.

The Dankuni-Kharagpur sector of NH 16 (old number NH 6) passes through this block.

== Education ==
In 2013-14, Kharagpur II CD block had 143 primary schools with 9,482 students, 5 middle schools with 515 students, 12 high schools with 5,263 students and 14 higher secondary schools with 13,626 students. Telipukur High School (H.S.), Madpur Girl's High school and Madpur Boy's High school are some of best school in this Block. Kharagpur II CD block had 418 institutions for special and non-formal education with 6,228 students.

The United Nations Development Programme considers the combined primary and secondary enrolment ratio as the simple indicator of educational achievement of the children in the school going age. The infrastructure available is important. In Kharagpur II CD block out of the total 142 primary schools in 2008-2009, 34 had pucca buildings, 38 partially pucca, 11 kucha and 59 multiple type.

Ambigeria Government College, also known as Madpur College, is the only general degree college in this block.

== Healthcare ==
In 2014, Kharagpur II CD block had 1 block primary health centre, 2 primary health centres and 4 private nursing homes with total 63 beds and 9 doctors. It had 25 family welfare sub centres and 1 family welfare centre. 1,579 patients were treated indoor and 69,104 patients were treated outdoor in the hospitals, health centres and subcentres of the CD block.

Changual Block Primary Health Centre, with 10 beds at Changual, is the major government medical facility in the Kharagpur II CD block. There are primary health centres at: Gokulpur (PO Bar Gokulpur) (with 6 beds) and Paparara (with 10 beds).

== Notable people ==
- Sheikh Najmul Haque (born 1951), six-time MLA of Kharagpur
