= Narayangarh (community development block) =

- Community development block
- Coordinates: 22.1514°N 87.3929°E
- Country: India
- State: West Bengal
- District: Paschim Medinipur

Government
  - Type: Federal democracy

Area
  - Total: 499.48 km^{2} (192.85 sq mi)
- Elevation: 24 m (79 ft)

Population (2011)
  - Total: 302,620
  - Density: 605.87/km^{2} (1,569.2/sq mi)

Languages
  - Official: Bengali, English
- Time zone: UTC+5:30 (IST)
- PIN: 721437 (Narayangarh)
- Telephone/STD code: 03229
- Vehicle registration: WB-34
- Literacy: 78.31%
- Lok Sabha constituency: Medinipur
- Vidhan Sabha constituency: Narayangarh
- Website: paschimmedinipur.gov.in

Narayangarh is a community development block that forms an administrative division in the Kharagpur subdivision of Paschim Medinipur district in the Indian state of West Bengal.

== History ==
The Narayangarh estate, covering 135 square miles (350 km^{2}), was held by the Kaibartta [sic] Rajas with titles "Srichandan" and "Mari Sultan". "Srichandan" from the Raja of Khurda, signifies investiture with sandalwood. "Mari Sultan" means "Lord of the Road", possibly granted for building a road in one night. The estate aided British against Marathas in 1760 and 1803. During the Chaitanya Yatra to Puri, the Raja was as Sodgop by caste.

== Geography ==
Narayangarh is a monotonous rice plain with numerous waterways and tidal creeks intersecting it. The tidal creeks are lined with embankments to prevent flooding of the fields. Much of the area is water-logged in the rainy season resulting in loss of crops. In Narayangarh CD block 90% of the cultivated area has alluvial soil and 10% has lateritic soil.

Narayangarh is located at 22°09′05″N 87°23′34″E.

Narayangarh CD block is bounded by Kharagpur I and Kharagpur II CD blocks in the north, Patashpur I CD block, in Purba Medinipur district, in the east, Dantan I and Dantan II CD blocks in the south and Keshiari CD block in the west.

It is located 33 km from Midnapore, the district headquarters.

Narayangarh CD block has an area of 499.48 km^{2}. It has 1 panchayat samity, 16 gram panchayats, 224 gram sansads (village councils), 516 mouzas and 466 inhabited villages. Narayagarh police station serves this block. Headquarters of this CD block is at Narayangarh.

Narayangarh CD block had a forest cover of 2,152 hectares, against a total geographical area of 49,197 hectares in 2005–06.

Gram panchayats of Narayangarh block/ panchayat samiti are: Bakhrabad, Belda I, Belda II, Gramraj, Hemchandra, Kashipur, Khurshi, Kunarpur, Kushbasan, Mannya, Mokrampur, Narayangarh, Narma, Pakurseni, Ranisarai and Tutranga.

== Demographics ==
=== Population ===
According to the 2011 Census of India, Narayangarh CD block had a total population of 302,620, of which 293,613 were rural and 9,007 were urban. There were 153,247 (51%) males and 149,373 (49%) females. Population in the age range 0–6 years was 34,797. Scheduled Castes numbered 56,333 (18.62%) and Scheduled Tribes numbered 68,080 (22.50%).

According to the 2001 census, Narayangarh block had a population of 266,450, out of which 136,091 were males and 130,359 females. Narayangarh block registered a population growth of 17.02 per cent during the 1991-2001 decade. Decadal growth for the combined Midnapore district was 14.87 per cent. Decadal growth in West Bengal was 17.45 per cent.

Census Towns in Narayangarh CD block are (2011 census figures in brackets): Deuli (9,007).

Large villages (with 4,000+ population) in Narayangarh CD block are (2011 census figures in brackets): Bahurupa (5,071).

Other villages in Narayangarh CD block include (2011 census figures in brackets): Belda (762), Mannya (1,144), Bakhrabad (1,295), Khursi (2,634), Kunarpur (1,145), Kashipur (1,569) and Kasba Narayangarh (3,626).

=== Literacy ===
According to the 2011 census the total number of literate persons in Narayangarh CD block was 209,734 (78.31% of the population over 6 years) out of which males numbered 116,222 (85.88% of the male population over 6 years) and females numbered 93,152 (70.31% of the female population over 6 years). The gender gap in literacy rates was 15.58%.

See also – List of West Bengal districts ranked by literacy rate

Literacy in CD blocks of
Paschim Medinipur district
Jhargram subdivision
Binpur I – 69.74%
Binpur II – 70.46%
Gopiballavpur I – 65.44%
Gopiballavpur II – 71.40%
Jamboni – 72.63%
Jhargram – 72.23%
Nayagram – 63.70%
Sankrail – 73.35%
Medinipur Sadar subdivision
Garhbeta I – 72.21%
Garhbeta II – 75.87%
Garhbeta III – 73.42%
Keshpur – 77.88%
Midnapore Sadar – 70.48%
Salboni – 74.87%
Ghatal subdivision
Chandrakona I – 78.93%
Chandrakona II – 75.96%
Daspur I – 83.99%
Daspur II – 85.62%
Ghatal – 81.08%
Kharagpur subdivision
Dantan I – 73.53%
Dantan II – 82.45%
Debra – 82.03%
Keshiari – 76.78%
Kharagpur I – 77.06%
Kharagpur II – 76.08%
Mohanpur – 80.51%
Narayangarh – 78.31%
Pingla – 83.57%
Sabang – 86.84%
2011 Census: CD Block Wise

Primary Census Abstract Data

=== Language and religion ===
Religion in Narayangarh CD block (2011)
Hinduism	93.79%
Islam	5.23%
Other or not stated	0.97%

In the 2011 census Hindus numbered 283,826 and formed 93.79% of the population in Narayangarh CD block. Muslims numbered 15,835 and formed 5.23% of the population.Others numbered 2959 and formed 0.97% of the population. Others include Addi Bassi, Marang Boro, Santal, Saranath, Sari Dharma, Sarna, Alchchi, Bidin, Sant, Saevdharm, Seran, Saran, Sarin, Kheria, and other religious communities. In 2001, Hindus were 94.53% and Muslims 4.89% of the population respectively.

Languages of Narayangarh CD block (2011)
1. Bengali (87.1%)
2. Santali (6.83%)
3. Urdu (2.20%)
4. Koda (1.19%)
5. Hindi (1.07%)
6. Others (1.58%)

At the time of the 2011 census, 87.13% of the population spoke Bengali, 6.83% Santali, 2.20% Urdu, 1.19% Koda and 1.07% Hindi as their first language.

== BPL families ==
In Narayangarh CD block 41.60% families were living below poverty line in 2007.

According to the District Human Development Report of Paschim Medinipur: The 29 CD blocks of the district were classified into four categories based on the poverty ratio. Nayagram, Binpur II and Jamboni CD blocks have very high poverty levels (above 60%). Kharagpur I, Kharagpur II, Sankrail, Garhbeta II, Pingla and Mohanpur CD blocks have high levels of poverty (50-60%), Jhargram, Midnapore Sadar, Dantan I, Gopiballavpur II, Binpur I, Dantan II, Keshiari, Chandrakona I, Gopiballavpur I, Chandrakona II, Narayangarh, Keshpur, Ghatal, Sabang, Garhbeta I, Salboni, Debra and Garhbeta III CD blocks have moderate levels of poverty (25-50%) and Daspur II and Daspur I CD blocks have low levels of poverty (below 25%).

== Economy ==
=== Infrastructure ===
465 or 90% of mouzas in Narayangarh CD block were electrified by 31 March 2014.

470 mouzas in Narayangarh CD block had drinking water facilities in 2013–14. There were 145 fertiliser depots, 42 seed stores and 64 fair price shops in the CD Block.

=== Agriculture ===
Persons engaged in agriculture
in Narayangarh CD block
1. Bargadars (6.87%)
2. Patta holders (27.8%)
3. Small farmers (2.27%)
4. Marginal farmers (13.3%)
5. Agricultural labourers (49.8%)

Although the Bargadari Act of 1950 recognised the rights of bargadars to a higher share of crops from the land that they tilled, it was not implemented fully. Large tracts, beyond the prescribed limit of land ceiling, remained with the rich landlords. From 1977 onwards major land reforms took place in West Bengal. Land in excess of land ceiling was acquired and distributed amongst the peasants. Following land reforms land ownership pattern has undergone transformation. In 2013–14, persons engaged in agriculture in Narayangarh CD block could be classified as follows: bargadars 6.87%, patta (document) holders 27.77%, small farmers (possessing land between 1 and 2 hectares) 2.27%, marginal farmers (possessing land up to 1 hectare) 13.33% and agricultural labourers 49.76%.

In 2005-06 the nett cropped area in Narayangarh CD block was 40,046 hectares and the area in which more than one crop was grown was 26,266 hectares.

The extension of irrigation has played a role in growth of the predominant agricultural economy. In 2013–14, the total area irrigated in Narayangarh CD block was 21,176 hectares, out of which 20 hectares were irrigated by canal water, 588 hectares by tank water, 19,508 hectares by deep tubewells, 510 hectares by shallow tubewells, 50 hectares by river lift irrigation and 500 hectares by other methods.

In 2013–14, Narayangarh CD Block produced 69,924 tonnes of Aman paddy, the main winter crop, from 38,050 hectares, 231 tonnes of Aus paddy (summer crop) from 109 hectares, 60,026 tonnes of Boro paddy (spring crop) from 17,073 hectares, 22 tonnes of wheat from 10 hectares and 120 tonnes of potatoes from 5 hectares. It also produced oilseeds.

=== Banking ===
In 2013–14, Narayangarh CD block had offices of 21 commercial banks.

== Transport ==
Narayangarh CD block has 3 ferry services and 3 originating/ terminating bus routes. Narayangarh railway station is situated on Kharagpur–Puri line.

== Education ==
In 2013–14, Narayangarh CD block had 234 primary schools with 16,696 students, 25 middle schools with 2,157 students, 13 high schools with 7,133 students and 24 higher secondary schools with 25,487 students. Narayangarh CD block had 1 general college with 1,673 students, 4 technical/ professional institutions and 673 institutions for special and non-formal education with 24,342 students.

The United Nations Development Programme considers the combined primary and secondary enrolment ratio as the simple indicator of educational achievement of the children in the school going age. The infrastructure available is important. In Narayangarh CD block out of the total 233 primary schools in 2008–2009, 50 had pucca buildings, 82 partially pucca, 16 kucha and 85 multiple type.

Belda College is a co-educational college established in 1963 at Belda. Affiliated to Vidyasagar University, it offers honours courses in Bengali, Santali, English, Sanskrit, history, philosophy, political science, economics, sociology, geography, education, music, physics, chemistry, mathematics, botany, zoology, nutrition, computer science and accountancy. It also offers a professional course in BCA, and MA in Bengali and English.

== Healthcare ==
In 2014, Narayangarh CD block had 1 rural hospital, 3 primary health centres and 8 private nursing homes with total 142 beds and 10 doctors. It had 45 family welfare sub centres and 1 family welfare centre. 11,058 patients were treated indoor and 84,293 patients were treated outdoor in the hospitals, health centres and subcentres of the CD block.

Belda Rural Hospital, with 60 beds at Belda, is the major government medical facility in the Narayangarh CD block. There are primary health centres at: Barakalonki (with 6 beds), Radhanagar (with 6 beds), Makrampur (with 10 bed) and Begunia (?).
