= Midnapore Sadar (community development block) =

- Community development block
- Coordinates: 22.422°N 87.328°E
- Country: India
- State: West Bengal
- District: Paschim Medinipur

Government
  - Type: Federal democracy

Area
  - Total: 323.64 km^{2} (124.96 sq mi)
- Elevation: 53 m (174 ft)

Population (2011)
  - Total: 191,705
  - Density: 592.34/km^{2} (1,534.2/sq mi)

Languages
  - Official: Bengali, Santali, English
- Time zone: UTC+5:30 (IST)
- PIN: 721102 (Vidyasagar University); 721130 (Pathra); 721150 (Panchkhuri)
- Area code: 03221
- ISO 3166 code: IN-WB
- Vehicle registration: WB-34
- Literacy: 70.48%
- Lok Sabha constituency: Medinipur
- Vidhan Sabha constituency: Medinipur, Kharagpur
- Website: paschimmedinipur.gov.in

Midnapore Sadar is a community development block that forms an administrative division in Medinipur Sadar subdivision of Paschim Medinipur district in the Indian state of West Bengal.

== History ==
=== Red corridor ===
106 districts spanning 10 states across India, described as being part of the left wing extremism activities, constitutes the Red corridor. In West Bengal the districts of Pashim Medinipur, Bankura, Purulia and Birbhum are part of the Red corridor. However, as of July 2016, there had been no reported incidents of Maoist-related activities from these districts for the previous 4 years. In the period 2009-2011 LWE violence resulted in more than 500 deaths and a similar number missing in Paschim Medinipur district.

Lalgarh movement, which started attracting attention after the failed assassination attempt on Buddhadeb Bhattacharjee, then chief minister of West Bengal, in the Salboni area of Paschim Medinipur district, on 2 November 2008 and the police action that followed, had also spread over to these areas. The movement was not just a political struggle but an armed struggle that concurrently took the look of a social struggle. A large number of CPI (M) activists, and others active in different political parties, were killed. Although the epi-centre of the movement was Lalgarh, it was spread across 19 police stations in three adjoining districts – Paschim Medinipur, Bankura and Purulia, all thickly forested and near the border with Jharkhand. The deployment of CRPF and other forces started on 11 June 2009. The movement came to an end after the 2011 state assembly elections and change of government in West Bengal. The death of Kishenji, the Maoist commander, on 24 November 2011 was the last major landmark.

From 2009 Maoist violence had rapidly spread across eleven western CD blocks of the district: Binpur I, Binpur II, Salboni, Grahbeta II, Jamboni, Jhargram, Midnapore Sadar, Gopiballavpur I, Gopiballavpur II, Sankrail and Nayagram.

== Geography ==
In Midnapore Sadar CD block 55% of the cultivated area has alluvial soil and 45% has lateritic soil. Midnapore Sadar CD block is drought prone.

Midnapore is located at 22°25′19″N 87°19′41″E.

Midnapore Sadar CD block is bounded by Salboni and Keshpur CD blocks in the north, Kharagpur II CD block in the east, Kharagpur I and Jhargram CD blocks in the south and Binpur I CD block in the west.

Midnapore Sadar CD block has an area of 323.64 km^{2}. It has 1 panchayat samity, 9 gram panchayats, 129 gram sansads (village councils), 271 mouzas and 232 inhabited villages. Medinipur police station serves this block. The headquarters of this CD block is at Barapathar Cantonment.

Midnapore Sadar CD block had a forest cover of 5,940 hectares, against a total geographical area of 33,300 hectares in 2005-06.

Gram panchayats of Midnapore Sadar block/ panchayat samiti are:Bonpura, Chandra, Dherua, Kankabati (Tantigeria), Monidaha, Panchkhuri I, Panchkhuri II, Pathra and Siromoni.

== Demographics ==
=== Population ===
According to the 2011 Census of India, Midnapore CD block had a total population of 191,705, all of which were rural. There were 97,490 (51%) males and 94,215 (49%) females. Population in the age range 0–6 years was 25,920. Scheduled Castes numbered 37,445 (19.53%) and Scheduled Tribes numbered 33,869 (17.67%).

As per 2001 census, Midnapore Sadar block had a total population of 157,584, out of which 80,824 were males and 76,760 were females. Midnapore Sadar block registered a population growth of 26.77 per cent during the 1991-2001 decade. Decadal growth for the combined Midnapore district was 14.87 per cent. Decadal growth in West Bengal was 17.84 per cent.

Large villages (with 4,000+ population) in Midnapore CD block are (2011 census figures in brackets): Khasjangal Cantonment (4,080), Ramnagar (4,223), Panchkhuri (4,612), Hatihalka (5,371) and Bhabaninagar (4,225).

Other villages in Midnapore CD block include (2011 census figures in brackets): Pathra (3,356), Banpura (3,544), Shiromani (2,619), Manidaha (2,438), Dherua (2,119), Chandra (675) and Kankabati (287).

=== Literacy ===
According to the 2011 census, the total number of literate persons in Midnapore CD block was 116,837 (70.48% of the population over 6 years) out of which males numbered 66,145 (78.43% of the male population over 6 years) and females numbered 50,702 (62.24% of the female population over 6 years). The gender gap in literacy rates was 16.19%.

See also – List of West Bengal districts ranked by literacy rate

Literacy in CD blocks of
Paschim Medinipur district
Jhargram subdivision
Binpur I – 69.74%
Binpur II – 70.46%
Gopiballavpur I – 65.44%
Gopiballavpur II – 71.40%
Jamboni – 72.63%
Jhargram – 72.23%
Nayagram – 63.70%
Sankrail – 73.35%
Medinipur Sadar subdivision
Garhbeta I – 72.21%
Garhbeta II – 75.87%
Garhbeta III – 73.42%
Keshpur – 77.88%
Midnapore Sadar – 70.48%
Salboni – 74.87%
Ghatal subdivision
Chandrakona I – 78.93%
Chandrakona II – 75.96%
Daspur I – 83.99%
Daspur II – 85.62%
Ghatal – 81.08%
Kharagpur subdivision
Dantan I – 73.53%
Dantan II – 82.45%
Debra – 82.03%
Keshiari – 76.78%
Kharagpur I – 77.06%
Kharagpur II – 76.08%
Mohanpur – 80.51%
Narayangarh – 78.31%
Pingla – 83.57%
Sabang – 86.84%
2011 Census: CD Block Wise

Primary Census Abstract Data

=== Language and religion ===
Religion in Medinipur Sadar CD block (2011)
Hinduism	71.74%
Islam	25.58%
Other (tribal religion)	2.44%
Other or not stated	0.24%

In the 2011 census Hindus numbered 137,527 and formed 71.74% of the population in Midnapore CD block. Muslims numbered 49,039 and formed 25.58% of the population. Others numbered 5,139 and formed 2.68% of the population. Others also include Addi Bassi, Marang Boro, Santal, Saranath, Sari Dharma, Sarna, Alchchi, Bidin, Sant, Saevdharm, Seran, Saran, Sarin, Kheria. Christians and other religious communities. In 2001, Hindus were 72.95%, Muslims 23.66% and tribal religions 3.26% of the population respectively.

Languages of Medinipur Sadar CD block (2011)
1. Bengali (88.7%)
2. Santali (10.6%)
3. Others (0.72%)

At the time of the 2011 census, 88.69% of the population spoke Bengali and 10.59% Santali as their first language.

== BPL families ==
In Midnapore Sadar CD block 31.95% families were living below poverty line in 2007.

According to the District Human Development Report of Paschim Medinipur: The 29 CD blocks of the district were classified into four categories based on the poverty ratio. Nayagram, Binpur II and Jamboni CD blocks have very high poverty levels (above 60%). Kharagpur I, Kharagpur II, Sankrail, Garhbeta II, Pingla and Mohanpur CD blocks have high levels of poverty (50-60%), Jhargram, Midnapore Sadar, Dantan I, Gopiballavpur II, Binpur I, Dantan II, Keshiari, Chandrakona I, Gopiballavpur I, Chandrakona II, Narayangarh, Keshpur, Ghatal, Sabang, Garhbeta I, Salboni, Debra and Garhbeta III CD blocks have moderate levels of poverty (25-50%) and Daspur II and Daspur I CD blocks have low levels of poverty (below 25%).

== Economy ==
=== Infrastructure ===
243 or 90% of mouzas in Midnapore CD block were electrified by 31 March 2014.

226 mouzas in Midnapore Sadar CD block had drinking water facilities in 2013-14. There were 84 fertiliser depots, 35 seed stores and 37 fair price shops in the CD Block.

=== Agriculture ===
Persons engaged in agriculture
in Midnapore Sadar CD block
1. Bargadars (5.52%)
2. Patta holders (30.8%)
3. Small farmers (3.07%)
4. Marginal farmers (20.9%)
5. Agricultural labourers (39.8%)

Although the Bargadari Act of 1950 recognised the rights of bargadars to a higher share of crops from the land that they tilled, it was not implemented fully. Large tracts, beyond the prescribed limit of land ceiling, remained with the rich landlords. From 1977 onwards major land reforms took place in West Bengal. Land in excess of land ceiling was acquired and distributed amongst the peasants. Following land reforms land ownership pattern has undergone transformation. In 2013-14, persons engaged in agriculture in Midnapore Sadar CD block could be classified as follows: bargadars 5.52%, patta (document) holders 30.79%, small farmers (possessing land between 1 and 2 hectares) 3.07%, marginal farmers (possessing land up to 1 hectare) 20.85% and agricultural labourers 39.77%.

In 2005-06 the nett cropped area in Midnapore Sadar CD block was 17,700 hectares and the area in which more than one crop was grown was 9,927 hectares.

The extension of irrigation has played a role in growth of the predominantly agricultural economy. In 2013-14, the total area irrigated in Midnapore Sadar CD block was 9,680 hectares, out of which 700 hectares were irrigated by canal water, 800 hectares by tank water, 4,830 hectares by deep tubewells, 2,400 hectares by shallow tube wells, 900 hectares by river lift irrigation, 40 hectares by open dug wells and 10 hectares by other methods.

In 2013-14, Midnapore Sadar CD block produced 85,138 tonnes of Aman paddy, the main winter crop, from 36,128 hectares, 5,062 tonnes of Aus paddy (summer crop) from 2,373 hectares, 921 tonnes of Boro paddy (spring crop) from 302 hectares, 1,904 tonnes of wheat from 1,072 hectares and 8,691 tonnes of potatoes from 638 hectares. It also produced oilseeds.

=== Banking ===
In 2013-14, Midnapore Sadar CD block had offices of 21 commercial banks and 3 gramin banks.

== Transport ==
Midnapore Sadar CD block has 2 ferry services and 8 originating/ terminating bus routes.

The Kharagpur-Adra line of South Eastern Railway passes through this CD block and there is a station at Midnapore (outside the CD block).

National Highway 14, (old numbering NH 60), running from Morgram to Kharagpur, passes through this CD block.

== Education ==
In 2013-14, Midnapore Sadar CD block had 118 primary schools with 12,078 students, 16 middle schools with 1,773 students, 1 high school with 2,998 students and 14 higher secondary schools with 32,153 students. Midnapore Sadar CD block had 366 institutions for special and non-formal education with 18,640 students.

The United Nations Development Programme considers the combined primary and secondary enrolment ratio as the simple indicator of educational achievement of the children in the school going age. The infrastructure available is important. In Midnapore Sadar CD block out of the total 117 primary schools in 2008-2009, 68 had pucca buildings, 12 partially pucca, 1 kucha and 36 multiple type.

Midnapore College and Raja Narendra Lal Khan Women's College is the general degree college in this block.

Vidyasagar University is also in this block.

== Healthcare ==
In 2014, Midnapore Sadar CD block had 1 block primary health centre and 2 primary health centres with total 31 beds and 6 doctors. It had 25 family welfare sub centres and 1 family welfare centre. 4,382 patients were treated indoor and 102,243 patients were treated outdoor in the hospitals, health centres and subcentres of the CD Block.

Chandra (Deypara) Block Primary Health Centre, with 15 beds at Chandra, is the major government medical facility in the Midnapore Sadar CD block. There are primary health centres at Panchkuri (with 10 beds) and Pathra (with 6 beds).
