= Garhbeta I =

- Community development block
- Coordinates: 22.86°N 87.36°E
- Country: India
- State: West Bengal
- District: Paschim Medinipur

Government
  - Type: Federal democracy

Area
  - Total: 361.87 km^{2} (139.72 sq mi)
- Elevation: 41 m (135 ft)

Population (2011)
  - Total: 228,513
  - Density: 631.48/km^{2} (1,635.5/sq mi)

Languages
  - Official: Bengali, English
- Time zone: UTC+5:30 (IST)
- PIN: 721121 (Amlagora); 721127 (Garhbeta)
- Area code: 03227
- Vehicle registration: WB-34
- Literacy: 72.21%
- Lok Sabha constituency: Jhargram
- Vidhan Sabha constituency: Garbeta
- Website: www.bdogarhbeta1.com//

Garhbeta I is a community development block that forms an administrative division in Medinipur Sadar subdivision of Paschim Medinipur district in the Indian state of West Bengal.

== Geography ==
In Garhbeta I CD block, 85% of the cultivated area has alluvial soil and 15% has lateritic soil. Garhbeta I CD block is drought prone.

Garbeta is located at 22°52′N 87°22′E.

Garhbeta I CD block is bounded by Taldangra, Bishnupur, Joypur and Kotulpur CD blocks in Bankura district in the north, Goghat II CD block in Hooghly district and Chandrakona I and Chandrakona II CD blocks in the east, Garhbeta III CD block in the south and Garhbeta II CD block in the west.

It is located 58 km from Midnapore, the district headquarters.

Garhbeta I CD block covers 361.87 km^{2} (139.72 sq mi). It has 1 panchayat samity, 12 gram panchayats, 162 gram sansads (village councils), 371 mouzas and 306 inhabited villages. Garhbeta and Goaltore police stations serve this block. The headquarters of this CD block is at Garbeta.

Garhbeta I CD block had a forest cover of 7,460 hectares, against a total geographical area of 36,117 hectares in 2005-06.

Gongoni Danga, a canyon-like formation on the banks of the Shilabati River is rich in mythology and history.

Gram panchayats of Garhbeta I block/ panchayat samiti are: Agra, Amkopa, Amlagora, Baramura, Benachapra, Dhadika, Garanga, Garhbeta, Kadrauttarbil, Kharkusma, Sandhipur and Shyamnagar.

== Demographics ==
=== Population ===
According to the 2011 Census of India, Garhbeta I CD block had a population of 228,513, of which 218,239 were rural and only 10,274 were urban. There were 116.620 (51%) males and 111,893 (49%) females. Population in the age-range 0–6 years was 28,076. Scheduled Castes numbered 55,133 (24.13%) and Scheduled Tribes numbered 18,134 (7.93%).

As per the 2001 census, Garhbeta I block had a total population of 200,393, out of which 102,687 were males and 97,706 were females. Garhbeta I block registered a population growth of 18.59 per cent during the 1991-2001 decade. Decadal growth for the combined Midnapore district was 14.87 per cent. Decadal growth in West Bengal was 17.84 per cent.

Census Towns in Garhbeta I CD block are (2011 census figures in brackets): Garbeta (5,109) and Amlagora (5,165).

Large villages (with 4,000+ population) in Garhbeta I CD block are (2011 census figures in brackets): Khar Kusum (5,428) and Lapuria (4,787).

Other villages in Garhbeta I CD block include (2011census figures in brackets): Bera Chapra (2,079), Agra (1,042), Dhadhika (2,566), Shyamnagar (1,565), Garanga (1,179) and Amkopa (396).

=== Literacy ===
According to the 2011 census, the total number of literate people in Garhbeta I CD block was 144,728 (72.21% of the population over 6 years) out of which males numbered 80,544 (78.80% of the male population over 6 years) and females numbered 64,184 (65.41% of the female population over 6 years).The gender gap in literacy rates was 13.39%.

See also – List of West Bengal districts ranked by literacy rate

Literacy in CD blocks of
Paschim Medinipur district
Jhargram subdivision
Binpur I – 69.74%
Binpur II – 70.46%
Gopiballavpur I – 65.44%
Gopiballavpur II – 71.40%
Jamboni – 72.63%
Jhargram – 72.23%
Nayagram – 63.70%
Sankrail – 73.35%
Medinipur Sadar subdivision
Garhbeta I – 72.21%
Garhbeta II – 75.87%
Garhbeta III – 73.42%
Keshpur – 77.88%
Midnapore Sadar – 70.48%
Salboni – 74.87%
Ghatal subdivision
Chandrakona I – 78.93%
Chandrakona II – 75.96%
Daspur I – 83.99%
Daspur II – 85.62%
Ghatal – 81.08%
Kharagpur subdivision
Dantan I – 73.53%
Dantan II – 82.45%
Debra – 82.03%
Keshiari – 76.78%
Kharagpur I – 77.06%
Kharagpur II – 76.08%
Mohanpur – 80.51%
Narayangarh – 78.31%
Pingla – 83.57%
Sabang – 86.84%
2011 Census: CD Block Wise

Primary Census Abstract Data

=== Languages and religion ===
Religion in Garhbeta I CD block (2011)
| Hinduism | 75.05% |
| Islam | 22.21% |
| Other (tribal religion) | 2.58% |
| Other or not stated | 0.16% |

In the 2011 census Hindus numbered 171,514 and formed 75.05% of the population in Garhbeta I CD block. Muslims numbered 50,743 and formed 22.21% of the population. Others numbered 6,256 and formed 2.74% of the population. Others include Addi Bassi, Marang Boro, Santal, Saranath, Sari Dharma, Sarna, Alchchi, Bidin, Sant, Saevdharm, Seran, Saran, Sarin, Kheria, Christians and other religious communities. In 2001, Hindus were 78.15%, Muslims 20.18% and tribal religions 3.15% of the population respectively.

Languages of Garhbeta I CD block (2011)
1. Bengali (92.7%)
2. Santali (6.79%)
3. Others (0.49%)

At the time of the 2011 census, 92.72% of the population spoke Bengali and 6.79% Santali as their first language.

== BPL families ==
In Garhbeta I CD block 36.17% families were living below poverty line in 2007.

According to the District Human Development Report of Paschim Medinipur: The 29 CD blocks of the district were classified into four categories based on the poverty ratio. Nayagram, Binpur II and Jamboni CD blocks have very high poverty levels (above 60%). Kharagpur I, Kharagpur II, Sankrail, Garhbeta II, Pingla and Mohanpur CD blocks have high levels of poverty (50-60%), Jhargram, Midnapore Sadar, Dantan I, Gopiballavpur II, Binpur I, Dantan II, Keshiari, Chandrakona I, Gopiballavpur I, Chandrakona II, Narayangarh, Keshpur, Ghatal, Sabang, Garhbeta I, Salboni, Debra and Garhbeta III CD blocks have moderate levels of poverty (25-50%) and Daspur II and Daspur I CD blocks have low levels of poverty (below 25%).

== Economy ==
=== Infrastructure ===
303 or 82% of mouzas in Garhbeta I CD block were electrified by 31 March 2014.

308 mouzas in Garhbeta I CD block had drinking water facilities in 2013-14. There were 304 fertiliser depots, 485 seed stores and 53 fair price shops in the CD block.

=== Agriculture ===
Persons engaged in agriculture
in Garhbeta I CD block
1. Bargadars (5.42%)
2. Patta holders (28.4%)
3. Small farmers (4.51%)
4. Marginal farmers (21.3%)
5. Agricultural labourers (40.4%)

Although the Bargadari Act of 1950 recognised the rights of bargadars to a higher share of crops from the land that they tilled, it was not implemented fully. Large tracts, beyond the prescribed limit of land ceiling, remained with the rich landlords. From 1977 onwards major land reforms took place in West Bengal. Land in excess of land ceiling was acquired and distributed amongst the peasants. Following land reforms land ownership pattern has undergone transformation. In 2013-14, persons engaged in agriculture in Garhbeta I CD block could be classified as follows: bargadars 5.42%, patta (document) holders 28.40%, small farmers (possessing land between 1 and 2 hectares) 4.51%, marginal farmers (possessing land up to 1 hectare) 21.27% and agricultural labourers 40.39%.

In 2005-06 the nett cropped area in Garhbeta I CD block was 18,452 hectares and the area in which more than one crop was grown was 17,826 hectares.

The extension of irrigation has played a role in growth of the predominantly agricultural economy. In 2013-14, the total area irrigated in Garhbeta I CD block was 18,960 hectares, out of which 800 hectares were irrigated by canal water, 510 hectares by tank water, 6,615 hectares by deep tubewells, 9,655 hectares by shallow tube wells, 340 hectares by river lift irrigation, 380 hectares by open dug wells and 660 hectares by other methods.

In 2013-14, Garhbeta I CD block produced 34,153 tonnes of Aman paddy, the main winter crop, from 19,350 hectares, 5,126 tonnes of Aus paddy (summer crop) from 2,443 hectares, 1,556 tonnes of Boro paddy (spring crop) from 522 hectares, 86 tonnes of wheat from 40 hectares and 72,472 tonnes of potatoes from 5,789 hectares. It also produced pulses and oilseeds.

=== Banking ===
In 2013-14, Garhbeta I CD block had offices of 11 commercial banks and 1 gramin bank.

== Transport ==
Garhbeta I CD block has 9 ferry services and 18 originating/ terminating bus routes.

The Kharagpur-Adra line of South Eastern Railway passes through this CD block and there are two stations at Garbeta & Bogri Road.

NH 14, (old numbering NH 60), running from Morgram (in Murshidabad district) to Kharagpur (in Paschim Medinipur district), passes through this CD block.

== Education ==
In 2013-14, Garhbeta I CD block had 180 primary schools with 14,190 students, 22 middle schools with 2,184 students, 7 high schools with 6,728 students and 15 higher secondary schools with 17,955 students. Garhbeta I CD block had 1 general college with 1,925 students and 435 institutions for special and non-formal education with 17,780 students.

The United Nations Development Programme considers the combined primary and secondary enrolment ratio as the simple indicator of educational achievement of the children in the school going age. The infrastructure available is important. In Garhbeta I CD block out of the total 177 primary schools in 2008-2009, 102 had pucca buildings, 10 partially pucca, 3 kacha and 62 multiple type.

Garhbeta College was established at Garbeta in 1948 and is affiliated to Vidyasagar University. It offers honours in English, Bengali, history, philosophy, geography, physics, chemistry, mathematics, botany and zoology.

== Healthcare ==
In 2014, Garhbeta I CD block had 1 rural hospital, 3 primary health centres, and 1 private nursing home with total 85 beds and 7 doctors. It had 37 family welfare sub centres and 1 family welfare centre. 9,424 patients were treated indoor and 138,809 patients were treated outdoor in the hospitals, health centres and subcentres of the CD block.

Garbeta Rural Hospital, with 60 beds at Garbeta is the major government facility in the Garhbeta I CD block. There are primary health centres at Sandhipur (with 10 beds), Parbatipur (PO Kharkusma)(with 6 beds) and Nohari (with 4 beds).

== Notable people ==
- Serajuddin Ahmad, MLA for Midnapore
