= Narayangarh, Paschim Medinipur =

Narayangarh
- Village
- Location in West Bengal, India Narayangarh (India)
- Coordinates: 22°10′02.6″N 87°23′05.6″E
- Country: India
- State: West Bengal
- District: Paschim Medinipur

Population (2011)
  - Total: 3,627

Languages*
  - Official: Bengali, Santali, English
- Time zone: UTC+5:30 (IST)
- PIN: 721437 (Narayangarh)
- Telephone/STD code: 03229
- Lok Sabha constituency: Medinipur
- Vidhan Sabha constituency: Narayangarh
- Website: paschimmedinipur.gov.in

Narayangarh (also called Kasba Narayangarh) is a major Town in the Narayangarh CD block in the Kharagpur subdivision of the Paschim Medinipur district in the state of West Bengal, India.

== Geography ==
Cities and towns in the southern portion of Kharagpur subdivision (including Dantan I & II, Mohanpur, Keshiary, Narayangarh and Sabang CD blocks) of Paschim Medinipur district
CT: census town, R: rural/ urban centre, H: historical/ religious centre
Owing to space constraints in the small map, the actual locations in a larger map may vary slightly

=== Location ===
Narayangarh is located at 22°10′02.6″N 87°23′05.6″E.

=== Area overview ===
Kharagpur subdivision, shown partly in the map alongside, mostly has alluvial soils, except in two CD blocks in the west – Kharagpur I and Keshiary, which mostly have lateritic soils. Around 74% of the total cultivated area is cropped more than once. With a density of population of 787 per km^{2}nearly half of the district’s population resides in this subdivision. 14.33% of the population lives in urban areas and 86.67% lives in the rural areas.

Note: The map alongside presents some of the notable locations in the subdivision. All places marked in the map are linked in the larger full screen map.

== Demographics ==
According to the 2011 Census of India Kasba Narayangarh had a total population of 3,627 of which 1,848 (51%) were males and 1,779 (49%) were females. Population in the age range 0– 6 years was 477. The total number of literate persons in Kasba Narayangarh was 2,137 (58.92% of the population over 6 years).

.* For language details see Narayangarh (community development block)#Language and religion

== Civic administration ==
=== CD block HQ ===
The headquarters of Narayangarh CD block are located at Narayangarh.

=== Police station ===
Narayangarh police station has jurisdiction over Narayangarh CD block.

== Transport ==
Narayangarh railway station is a station on the Kharagpur-Puri line of South Eastern Railway.

The Kolkata-Chennai National Highway 16 passes through Narayangarh.

== See also ==
- Narayangarh Raj
