= Sabang, Paschim Medinipur =

Sabang
- Village
- Location in West Bengal, India Sabang (India)
- Coordinates: 22°10′58.8″N 87°35′56.4″E
- Country: India
- State: West Bengal
- District: Paschim Medinipur

Population (2011)
  - Total: 13,224

Languages*
  - Official: Bengali, Santali, English
- Time zone: UTC+5:30 (IST)
- PIN: 721144 (Sabang)
- Telephone/STD code: 03228
- Lok Sabha constituency: Ghatal
- Vidhan Sabha constituency: Sabang
- Website: paschimmedinipur.gov.in

Sabang is a village in the Sabang CD block in the Kharagpur subdivision of the Paschim Medinipur district in the state of West Bengal, India.

== Geography ==
Cities and towns in the southern portion of Kharagpur subdivision (including Dantan I & II, Mohanpur, Keshiary, Narayangarh and Sabang CD blocks) of Paschim Medinipur district
CT: census town, R: rural/ urban centre, H: historical/ religious centre
Owing to space constraints in the small map, the actual locations in a larger map may vary slightly

=== Location ===
Sabang is located at 22°10′58.8″N 87°35′56.4″E.

=== Area overview ===
Kharagpur subdivision, shown partly in the map alongside, mostly has alluvial soils, except in two CD blocks in the west – Kharagpur I and Keshiary, which mostly have lateritic soils. Around 74% of the total cultivated area is cropped more than once. With a density of population of 787 per km^{2}nearly half of the district’s population resides in this subdivision. 14.33% of the population lives in urban areas and 86.67% lives in the rural areas.

Note: The map alongside presents some of the notable locations in the subdivision. All places marked in the map are linked in the larger full screen map.

== Demographics ==
According to the 2011 Census of India, Sabang had a total population of 13,224 of which 6,759 (51%) were males and 6,465 (49%) were females. Population in the age range 0-6 years was 1,567. The total number of literate persons in Sabang was 9,942 (75.18% of the population over 6 years).

.*For language details see Sabang (community development block)#Language and religion

== Civic administration ==
=== CD block HQ ===
The headquarters of Sabang CD block are located at Sabang.

=== Police station ===
Sabang police station has jurisdiction over Sabang CD block.

== Economy ==
Sabang is the wholesale market for raw madur sticks (Cyperus tegetum or Cyperus pangorei), which grow well in the alluvial tracts of Paschim and Purba Medinipur districts. There are about 60,000 mat weavers (mostly women) in the two districts.

== Education ==
Sabang Sajani Kanta Mahavidyalaya at Lutunia was established in 1970 and is affiliated to Vidyasagar University. It offers undergraduate courses in arts, commerce and science. The college is named after Sajanikanta Giri, who had contributed handsomely to set up the college.

Sabang Industrial Training Institute is situated at Uddhabpur P.O Mohar Sabang. Sabang ITI offers four courses 1.Electrician 2.Fitter 3.Plumber 4.Health Sanitary inspector. Ujjwal Maity is principal of Sabang ITI.

== Healthcare ==
Sabang Rural Hospital, with 40 beds at Sabang, is the major government medical facility in the Sabang CD block.
