= Medinipur Sadar subdivision =

- Subdivision
- Interactive map of Medinipur Sadar subdivision
- Coordinates: 22.25°N 87.65°E
- Country: India
- State: West Bengal
- District: Paschim Medinipur
- Headquarters: Midnapore

Area
  - Total: 2,441.50 km^{2} (942.67 sq mi)

Population
  - Total: 1,435,321
  - Density: 587.885/km^{2} (1,522.61/sq mi)

Languages
  - Official: Bengali, English
- Time zone: UTC+5:30 (IST)
- ISO 3166 code: IN-WB
- Vehicle registration: WB
- Website: wb.gov.in

Medinipur Sadar subdivision is an administrative subdivision of the Paschim Medinipur district in the state of West Bengal, India.

== Subdivisions ==
Paschim Medinipur district is divided into the following administrative subdivisions, after separation of Jhargram subdivision from the district in 2017:

Subdivision	Headquarters	Area km^{2}	Population (2011)	Rural population % (2011)	Urban population % (2011)
Medinipur Sadar	Midnapore	2,441.50	1,435,321	86.05	13.95
Kharagpur	Kharagpur	2,913.17	2,293,909	85.67	14.33
Ghatal	Ghatal	953.09	1,047,679	87.94	12.06
Paschim Medinipur district	Midnapore	6,307.76	4,776,909	86.28	13.72

Medinipur Sadar subdivision has a density of population of 588 per km^{2}. 30.05% of the district population resides in this subdivision.

== Administrative units ==
Medinipur Sadar subdivision has 6 police stations, 6 community development blocks, 6 panchayat samitis, 64 gram panchayats, 2,370 mouzas, 1971 inhabited villages, 1 municipality and 5 census towns. The single municipality is at Midnapore. The census towns are: Garbeta, Amlagora, Durllabhganj, Dwarigeria and Naba Kola. The subdivision has its headquarters at Midnapore.

Cities and towns in Medinpur Sadar subdivision of Paschim Medinipur district
M: municipal city/ town, CT: census town, R: rural/ urban centre, H: historical/ religious centre, F: facilities
Owing to space constraints in the small map, the actual locations in a larger map may vary slightly

== Police stations ==
Police stations in Medinipur Sadar subdivision have the following features and jurisdiction:

Police Station	Area covered km^{2}	Municipal Town	CD Block
Midnapore	n/a	Midnapore	Midnapore Sadar
Garbeta	n/a	-	Garhbeta I, Garhbeta II, Garhbeta III
Goaltore	n/a	-	Garhbeta I, Garhbeta II, Garhbeta III
Keshpur	n/a	-	Keshpur partly
Anandapur	n/a	-	Keshpur partly
Salboni	n/a	-	Salboni

== Gram panchayats ==
The subdivision contains 64 gram panchayats under 6 community development blocks:

- Midnapore Sadar Block: Banpura, Monidaha, Pathra, Chandra, Panchkhuri–I, Shiromoni, Dherua, Panchkhuri–II and Tantigeria.
- Garhbeta I Block: Agra, Baramura, Garanga, Kharkusma, Amkopa, Benachapra, Garhbeta, Sandhipur, Amlagora, Dhadika, Katra Uttarbil and Shyamnagar.
- Garhbeta II Block: Amlasuli, Jeerapara, Patharpara, Sarboth, Goaltore, Jogardanga, Pingboni, Gohaldanga, Makli and Piasala.
- Garhbeta III Block: Amsole, Nalbona, Raskunda, Shankarkanta, Karsa, Nayabasat, Satbankura and Uriasai.
- Keshpur Block: Amanpur, Enayetpur, Kalagram, Sarisha Khola, Amrakuchi, Golar, Jhentla, Shirsha, Anandapur, Jagannathpur, Keshpur, Teghari, Dhalhara, Jorakeudi Solidiha and Mugbasan.
- Salboni Block: Bankibandh, Debgram, Kashijora, Shatpati, Bhimpur, Garhmal, Lalgeria, Bishnupur, Karnagarh and Salboni.

== Blocks ==
Community development blocks in Medinipur subdivision are:

CD block	Headquarters	Area km^{2}	Population (2011)	SC %	ST %	Literacy rate %	Census towns
Salboni	Salboni	553.39	188,563	18.61	17.38	74.87	
Keshpur	Keshpur	483.15	339,248	26.45	5.78	85.24	
Garhbeta I	Garbeta	361.87	228,513	24.13	7.93	72.21	2
Garhbeta II	Goaltore	392.55	148,410	26.48	19.99	75.87	
Garhbeta III	Satbankura	312.22	169,528	15.34	14.13	72.21	3
Midnapore Sadar	Barapathar Cantonment	323.64	191,705	19.53	17.67	70.48	

== Education ==
Paschim Medinipur district had a literacy rate of 78.00% as per the provisional figures of the census of India 2011. Medinipur Sadar subdivision had a literacy rate of 77% Kharagpur subdivision 80.51% and Ghatal subdivision 82.55%.

Given in the table below is a subdivision-wise comprehensive picture of the education scenario in Paschim Medinipur district, after separation of Jhargram subdivision, for the year 2013-14.

Subdivision	Primary school		Middle school		High school		Higher secondary school		General college, univ		Technical / professional instt		Non-formal education	
Subdivision	Institution	Student	Institution	Student	Institution	Student	Institution	Student	Institution	Student	Institution	Student	Institution	Student
Medinipur Sadar	1,086	88,909	118	13,825	45	38,322	118	143,051	8	11,058	15	2,281	2,844	112,971
Kharagpur	1,576	131,008	126	8,902	127	63,099	170	177,644	7	9,058	12	11,190	4,365	147,242
Ghatal	786	59,984	30	2,543	88	44,064	66	65,255	4	4,413	5	626	1,501	54,169
Paschim Medinipur district	3,448	279,901	274	25,270	260	145,485	354	385,950	19	24,529	32	14,097	8,700	314,382

Note: Primary schools include junior basic schools; middle schools, high schools and higher secondary schools include madrasahs; technical schools include junior technical schools, junior government polytechnics, industrial technical institutes, industrial training centres, nursing training institutes etc.; technical and professional colleges include engineering colleges, medical colleges, para-medical institutes, management colleges, teachers training and nursing training colleges, law colleges, art colleges, music colleges etc. Special and non-formal education centres include sishu siksha kendras, madhyamik siksha kendras, adult high schools, centres of Rabindra mukta vidyalaya, recognised Sanskrit tols, institutions for the blind and other handicapped persons, Anganwadi centres, reformatory schools etc.

The following institutions are located in Medinipur Sadar subdivision:

- Vidyasagar University at Midnapore was established in 1981 as an affiliating university.
- Midnapore Medical College and Hospital at Midnapore was established in 2004.
- Midnapore College at Midnapore was established in 1873. It was granted autonomous status in 2014-15. It offers under-graduate and post-graduate courses
- Midnapore Law College at Midnapore was established in 2002. It offers 5-years course in BA LLB (Hons) and 3-years course in LLB.
- K.D. College of Commerce and General Studies at Midnapore was established in 1961.
- Raja Narendra Lal Khan Women's College at Midnapore was established in 1957.
- Salboni Government College was established at Salboni in 2011.
- Sukumar Sengupta Mahavidyalaya at Keshpur was established in 2004.
- Garhbeta College was established at Garbeta in 1948.
- Santal Bidroha Sardha Satabarsiki Mahavidyalaya at Goaltore was established in 2005.
- Gourav Guin Memorial College was established at Chandrakona Road, PO Satbankura in 2008.

== Healthcare ==
The table below (all data in numbers) presents an overview of the subdivision-wise medical facilities available and patients treated, after the separation of Jhargram, in the hospitals, health centres and sub-centres in 2014 in Paschim Medinipur district.

Subdivision	Health & Family Welfare Deptt, WB				Other state govt deptts	Local bodies	Central govt deptts / PSUs	NGO / private nursing homes	Total	Total number of beds	Total number of doctors	Indoor patients	Outdoor patients
Subdivision	Hospitals	Rural hospitals	Block primary health centres	Primary health centres	Other state govt deptts	Local bodies	Central govt deptts / PSUs	NGO / private nursing homes	Total	Total number of beds	Total number of doctors	Indoor patients	Outdoor patients
Medinipur Sadar	2	5	1	15	3	-	1	26	53	2,117	323	121,486	1,375,817
Kharagpur	2	8	2	27	2	1	2	54	98	1841	197	93,110	1,814,309
Ghatal	1	4	1	15	-	-	-	46	67	988	66	46,006	742,984
Paschim Medinipur district	5	17	24	77	5	1	3	126	208	4,946	586*	260,602	3,933,110

- Excluding nursing homes

=== Medical facilities ===
Medical facilities in the Medinipur Sadar subdivision are as follows:

Hospitals: (Name, location, beds)

Rural government hospitals: (Name, CD block, location, beds)

- Salboni Rural Hospital, Salboni CD block, Salboni, 35 beds
- Keshpur Rural Hospital, Keshpur CD block, Keshpur, 30 beds
- Garbeta Rural Hospital, Garhbeta I CD block, Garbeta, 60 beds
- Kewakole Rural Hospital, Garhbeta II CD block, Goaltore, 30 beds
- Dwarigeria Rural Hospital, Garhbeta III CD block, Dwarigeria, 30 beds

Block primary health centres: (Name, CD block, location, beds)

- Chandra (Deypara) Block Primary Health Centre, Midnapore Sadar CD block, Chandra, 15 beds

Primary health centres : (CD block-wise) (CD block, PHC location, beds)

- Midnapore Sadar CD block: Panchkuri (10), Pathra (6)
- Salboni CD block: Godapaisal (10), Bhimpur (6), Pirakata (4)
- Keshpur CD block: Dhalhara (PO Pursura) (6), Mahaboni (PO Mohabani) (10), Anandapur (6)
- Garhbeta I CD block: Sandhipur (10), Parbatipur (PO Kharkusma)(6), Nohari (4)
- Garhbeta II CD block: Charubala (PO Bulanpur) (4), Babuidanga (PO Amlasuli) (10)
- Garhbeta III CD block: Chottotara (PO Guiadaha) (10), Nayabasat (4)

Private hospitals

- Annapurna Nursing Home Vill + PO: Panchberia, PS - Daspur, Panchberia, Pin - 721146
- Arogya Seva Sadan Vill+PO : Krishnagar, PS: KGP Dist. Paschim Midnapore Pin - 721143
- Arogya Seva Sadan Vill+PO-Krishnanagar, PS- Kharagpur, West Midnapore, W.B.-721149
- Disha Nursing Home Kushpata, Ghatal, West Midnapore, W.B.-721212
- Divine Health Point Vill+PO- Madpur, PS- Kharagpur Local, West Midnapore, W.B.-721149
- Gandhi Mission trust L.C. Dani Eye Hospital - Daspur Dihibaliharpur, Daspur, West Midnapore, W.B.-721211
- Ganga Nursing Home - Balichak Vill- Golui, PO - Balichak, PS - Debra, Paschim Midnapore - 721124
- Paschim Medinipur Jeevan Deep Nursing Home AT - Kushpata, PO + PS - Ghatal Pin - 721212
- K.G. Medicare (Multi Speciality Hospital) Hospital Road (Harishan Dighi Market Complex) Battalachowk Midnapore - 721101
- Life Care Nursing Home Prembazar, 25, Vivekananda Road High Coop. Kharagpur 721306
- Life Line Nursing Home Vill+PO+PS- Gobindapur, West Midnapore, W.B.-721146 Nemai
- Maa-Kali Nursing Home Vill+PO- Panchberia, West Midnapore
- Mahamaya Nursing Home - Midnapore town Keranitala, PO- Midnapore PS- Kotwali, West Midnapore, W.B.-721101
- Matri Asish Nursing Home - Sultanpur-KGP - II Vill- Sultanpur, PO- Hat Sultanpur, West Midnapore, W.B.-721149
- Midnapur Eye Bank & Eye Care Unit Prembazar, Kharagpur, West Midnapore, W.B.-721306 Hospital
- Midnapur Rotary Eye Hospital B-3, Burdge Town, PS- West Midnapore, W.B.-721101
- Moonlight Nursing Home - Ghatal Kushpata, Ghatal, West Midnapore, W.B.-721212
- Mother Nursing Home Gobindanagar, Goura, West Midnapore, W.B.-721146
- New Ashirbad Nursing Home Vill- Bagda, PO+PS- Mohanpur, West Midnapore, W.B.
- New Karmakar Nursing Home Dakshin Bazar, Chandrakona, Paschim Midnapore - WB - 721201
- New Life Nursing Home Kushpata, Ghatal, West Midnapore, W.B.-721212
- New Srima Nursing Home Vill + PO Goura, PS Daspur Dist. Paschim Midnapore
- Rai Nursing Home Vill- Kalyanpur, PO- Arjuni, PS- Debra, NH-6, West Midnapore, W.B.-721126
- Ramkrishna Seva Sadan Vill- Baragarh, PO- Debra Bazar, PS- Debra, West Midnapore, W.B.-721146
- Sabita Nursing Home - Ghatal Kushpata, Ghatal, West Midnapore, W.B.-721212
- Salua Nursing Home Salua Kharagpur Kharagpur 721145 Dist Midnapore West Bengal
- Shivananda Nayanalok Eye Hospital Math Bishmupur, PS- Debra, West Midnapore, W.B.-721136
- Shree Maa Nursing Home Vill. Debra Bazar, Paschim Medinipore Paschim Medinipore 721126
- Spandan Diagnostic Centre Rabindranagar Midnapore Midnapore 721101 Dist Midnapore West Bengal
- Sri Durga Nursing Home Vill- Baragarh, PO- Debra Bazar, PS- Debra, West Midnapore, W.B.-721146
- Sristi Nursing Home - Ghatal Vill: Konnagar, PO+PS- Ghatal, West Midnapore, W.B.-721212
- St. Josephs Hospital (Seva Kendra Calcutta) Phulpahari, Vidyasagar University Vidyasagar University Pachim Midnapore 721102
- Tara Ma Nursing Home 560, Math Bishnupur,
- Taramahal Nursing Home Vill + PO + PS: Keshpur, Dist - Paschim Midnapore, Pin 721150

== Electoral constituencies ==
Lok Sabha (parliamentary) and Vidhan Sabha (state assembly) constituencies in Paschim Medinipur district were as follows from 2006:

Lok Sabha constituency	Vidhan Sabha constituency	Reservation	CD block and/or gram panchayats
Jhargram (ST)	Garbeta	None	Garhbeta I CD Block and Amlasuli, Jogardanga, Piyasala and Sarboth GPs of Garhbeta II CD Block.
	Salboni	None	Bhimpur, Bishnupur, Debgram, Lalgeria and Salboni GPs of Salboni CD Block, Goaltor, Gohaldanga, Jeerapara, Makli, Patharpara and Pingbani GPs of Garhbeta II CD Block and Garhbeta III CD Block.
	Other assembly segments outside the district		
Medinipur	Egra	None	Egra municipality, Egra I CD Block, and Basudevpur, Deshbandhu, Dubda, Manjusree, Paniparul, Sarbaday and Bibekananda GPs of Egra II CD Block in Purba Medinipur district.
	Dantan	None	Dantan II and Mohanpur CD Blocks, and Chak Islampur GP of Dantan I CD Block.
	Keshiary	ST	Keshiari CD Block, and Alikosha, Angua, Ainkola, Dantan I, Dantan II, Monoharpur, Salikotha and Tararui GPs of Dantan I CD Block.
	Kharagpur Sadar	None	Kharagpur municipality and Kharagpur Railway Settlement of Kharagpur I CD Block.
	Narayangarh	None	Narayangarh
	Kharagpur	None	Kharagpur I CD Block, and Banpura, Panchkhuri I, Panchkhuri II, Pathra and Shiromoni GPs of Midnapore Sadar CD Block.
	Medinipur	None	Midnapore municipality, Chandra, Dherua, Monidaha and Tantigeria GPs of Midnapore Sadar CD Block and Bankibandh, Garhmal, Karnagarh, Kashijora and Shatpati GPs of Salboni CD Block.
Ghatal	Panskura Paschim	None	Panskura I CD Block in Purba Medinipur district.
	Sabang	None	Sabang CD Block, and Jalchak I, Jalchak II and Maligram GPs of Pingla CD Block.
	Pingla	None	Dhaneswarpur, Gobordhanpur, Jamna, Karkai, Kshirai, Kusumda and Pindurui GPs of Pingla CD Block and Kharagpur II CD Block
	Debra	None	Debra CD Block
	Daspur	None	Daspur II, and Basudevpur, Daspur I, Daspur II, Nandanpur I, Nandanpur II and Panchberia GPs of Daspur I CD Block.
	Ghatal	SC	Ghatal municipality, Ghatal CD Block, Khara municipality, and Rajnagar, Sarberia I and Sarberia II GPs of Daspur I CD Block.
	Keshpur	SC	Keshpur CD Block.

== Notable people ==
- Serajuddin Ahmad, MLA for Midnapore
