= Chandrakona Road =

Town in West Bengal

- Inhabited place
- Location in West Bengal, India Chandrakona Road (India)
- Coordinates: 22.73694°N 87.33652°E
- Country: India
- State: West Bengal
- District: Paschim Medinipur

Languages
  - Official: Bengali, Santali, English
- Time zone: UTC+5:30 (IST)
- PIN: 721253 (Satbankura)
- Telephone/STD code: 03227
- Lok Sabha constituency: Jhargram
- Vidhan Sabha constituency: Salboni
- Website: paschimmedinipur.gov.in

Chandrakona Road is an inhabited place in the Garhbeta III CD block in the Medinipur Sadar subdivision of the Paschim Medinipur district, West Bengal, India.

== Geography ==
Cities and towns in Medinpur Sadar subdivision of Paschim Medinipur district
M: municipal city/ town, CT: census town, R: rural/ urban centre, H: historical/ religious centre, F: facilities
Owing to space constraints in the small map, the actual locations in a larger map may vary slightly

=== Location ===
Chandrakona Road is located at 22.73694°N 87.33652°E.

=== Area overview ===
The Paschim Medinipur district, before separation from Jhargram, had a total forest area of 1,700 km^{2}, accounting for 14.31% of the total forested area of the state. It is obvious from the map of the Midnapore Sadar subdivision, placed alongside, is that there are large stretches of forests in the subdivision. The soil is predominantly lateritic. Around 30% of the population of the district resides in this subdivision. 13.95% of the population lives in urban areas and 86.05% lives in the rural areas.

Note: The map alongside presents some of the notable locations in the subdivision. All places marked in the map are linked in the larger full screen map.

== Civic administration ==
Garbeta police station has an outpost at Chandrakona Road.

== Transport ==
The town is situated at the intersection of the National Highway 14, running from Morgram to Kharagpur (Old National Highway 60) and the National Highway 116B, running from Nandakumar to Chandaneswar.

Chandrakona Road railway station is situated on Kharagpur–Bankura–Adra line of South Eastern railway zone.

== Education ==
Gourav Guin Memorial College was established at Chandrakona Road, PO Satbankura in 2008. Affiliated with Vidyasagar University, it offers honours courses in Bengal, English and history and a general course in arts.
