= Biman Mahata =

Indian politician (born 1990)

Member of the West Bengal Legislative Assembly
- Incumbent
- Assumed office 4 May 2026
- Preceded by: Srikanta Mahata
- Constituency: Salboni

Personal details
- Born: March 27, 1990 (age 36)
- Party: Bharatiya Janata Party
- Profession: Politician

Biman Mahata (born 27 March 1990) is an Indian politician from West Bengal. He is a member of the West Bengal Legislative Assembly from the Salboni Assembly constituency in Paschim Medinipur district representing the Bharatiya Janata Party.

== Early life and education ==
Mahata is from Salboni, Paschim Medinipur district, West Bengal. He is the son of Balaram Mahata. He completed his MA at Vidyasagar University in 2013. He is a culitator. He declared assets worth Rs.9 lakhs in his affidavit to the Election Commission of India.

== Career ==
Mahata won the Salboni Assembly constituency representing the Bharatiya Janata Party in the 2026 West Bengal Legislative Assembly election. He polled 1,32,856 votes and defeated his nearest rival and two time sitting MLA, Srikanta Mahata of the All India Trinamool Congress by a margin of 15,243 votes.
