= Naba Kola =

- Census Town
- Location in West Bengal, India Naba Kola (India)
- Coordinates: 22.7258°N 87.3545°E
- Country: India
- State: West Bengal
- District: Paschim Medinipur

Area
  - Total: 1.6375 km^{2} (0.6322 sq mi)

Population (2011)
  - Total: 6,169
  - Density: 3,767/km^{2} (9,757/sq mi)

Languages*
  - Official: Bengali, Santali, English
- Time zone: UTC+5:30 (IST)
- PIN: 721253
- Telephone/STD code: 03227
- Lok Sabha constituency: Jhargram
- Vidhan Sabha constituency: Salboni
- Website: paschimmedinipur.gov.in

Naba Kola is a census town in the Garhbeta III CD block in the Medinipur Sadar subdivision of the Paschim Medinipur district in the state of West Bengal, India.

== Geography ==
Cities and towns in Medinpur Sadar subdivision of Paschim Medinipur district
M: municipal city/ town, CT: census town, R: rural/ urban centre, H: historical/ religious centre, F: facilities
Owing to space constraints in the small map, the actual locations in a larger map may vary slightly

=== Location ===
Naba Kola is located at 22.7258°N 87.3545°E.

=== Area overview ===
Paschim Medinipur district (before separation of Jhargram) had a total forest area of 1,700 km^{2}, accounting for 14.31% of the total forested area of the state. It is obvious from the map of the Midnapore Sadar subdivision, placed alongside, is that there are large stretches of forests in the subdivision. The soil is predominantly lateritic. Around 30% of the population of the district resides in this subdivision. 13.95% of the population lives in urban areas and 86.05% lives in the rural areas.

Note: The map alongside presents some of the notable locations in the subdivision. All places marked in the map are linked in the larger full screen map.

== Demographics ==
According to the 2011 Census of India, Naba Kola had a total population of 6,169, of which 3,093 (50%) were males and 3,076 (50%) were females. There were 1,127 persons in the age range of 0–6 years. The total number of literate persons in Naba Kola was 2,853 (50.58% of the population over 6 years).

.*For language details see Garhbeta III#Language and religion

== Infrastructure ==
According to the District Census Handbook 2011, Paschim Medinipur, Naba Kola covered an area of 1.6375 km^{2}. Among the civic amenities, it had 2.5 km roads with open drains, the protected water supply involved hand pumps, borewell, tubewell. It had 930 domestic electric connections, 10 road lighting points. Among the medical facilities it had 1 hospital. Among the educational facilities it had were 1 primary school, 1 secondary school, the nearest senior secondary school at Dabeha 1 km away. An important commodity it manufactures is wooden work. It has a branch office of 1 non-agricultural credit society.
