= Pingboni =

- Village
- Location in West Bengal, India Pingboni (India)
- Coordinates: 22°42′44.7″N 87°08′39.7″E
- Country: India
- State: West Bengal
- District: Paschim Medinipur

Population (2011)
  - Total: 2,366

Languages*
  - Official: Bengali, Santali, English
- Time zone: UTC+5:30 (IST)
- PIN: 721228 (Pingboni)
- Lok Sabha constituency: Jhargram
- Vidhan Sabha constituency: Salboni
- Website: paschimmedinipur.gov.in

Pingboni is a village and gram panchayat in the Garhbeta II CD block in the Medinipur Sadar subdivision of the Paschim Medinipur district in the state of West Bengal, India.

== Geography ==
Cities and towns in Medinpur Sadar subdivision of Paschim Medinipur district
M: municipal city/ town, CT: census town, R: rural/ urban centre, H: historical/ religious centre, F: facilities
Owing to space constraints in the small map, the actual locations in a larger map may vary slightly

=== Location ===
Pingboni is located at 22°42′44.7″N 87°08′39.7″E.

=== Area overview ===
Paschim Medinipur district (before separation of Jhargram) had a total forest area of 1,700 km^{2}, accounting for 14.31% of the total forested area of the state. It is obvious from the map of the Midnapore Sadar subdivision, placed alongside, is that there are large stretches of forests in the subdivision. The soil is predominantly lateritic. Around 30% of the population of the district resides in this subdivision. 13.95% of the population lives in urban areas and 86.05% lives in the rural areas.

Note: The map alongside presents some of the notable locations in the subdivision. All places marked in the map are linked in the larger full screen map.

== Demographics ==
According to the 2011 Census of India Pingboni had a total population of 2,366 of which 1,188 (50%) were males and 1,178 (50%) were females. Population in the age range 0-6 years was 253. The total number of literate persons in Pingboni was 1,565 (66.15% of the population over 6 years).

.*For language details see Garhbeta II#Language and religion

== Transport ==
State Highway 4 (West Bengal) running from Jhalda (in Purulia district) to Digha (in Purba Medinipur district) passes through Pingboni.
