= Durllabhganj =

- Census Town
- Location in West Bengal, India Durllabhganj (India)
- Coordinates: 22.7358°N 87.3346°E
- Country: India
- State: West Bengal
- District: Paschim Medinipur

Area
  - Total: 1.11 km^{2} (0.43 sq mi)

Population (2011)
  - Total: 6,796
  - Density: 6,120/km^{2} (15,900/sq mi)

Languages*
  - Official: Bengali, Santali, English
- Time zone: UTC+5:30 (IST)
- PIN: 721253
- Telephone/STD code: 03227
- Vehicle registration: WB
- Lok Sabha constituency: Jhargram
- Vidhan Sabha constituency: Salboni
- Website: paschimmedinipur.gov.in

Durllabhganj is a census town in the Garhbeta III CD block in the Medinipur Sadar subdivision of the Paschim Medinipur district in the state of West Bengal, India.

== Geography ==
Cities and towns in Medinpur Sadar subdivision of Paschim Medinipur district
M: municipal city/ town, CT: census town, R: rural/ urban centre, H: historical/ religious centre, F: facilities
Owing to space constraints in the small map, the actual locations in a larger map may vary slightly

=== Location ===
Durllabhganj is located at 22.7358°N 87.3346°E.

=== Area overview ===
Paschim Medinipur district (before separation of Jhargram) had a total forest area of 1,700 km^{2}, accounting for 14.31% of the total forested area of the state. It is obvious from the map of the Midnapore Sadar subdivision, placed alongside, is that there are large stretches of forests in the subdivision. The soil is predominantly lateritic. Around 30% of the population of the district resides in this subdivision. 13.95% of the population lives in urban areas and 86.05% lives in the rural areas.

Note: The map alongside presents some of the notable locations in the subdivision. All places marked in the map are linked in the larger full screen map.

== Demographics ==
According to the 2011 Census of India, Durllabhganj had a total population of 6,796, of which 3,436 (51%) were males and 3,360 (49%) were females. There were 607 persons in the age range of 0–6 years. The total number of literate persons in Durllabhganj was 5,613 (90.69% of the population over 6 years).

As of 2001 India census, Durllabhganj had a population of 6129. Males constitute 52% of the population and females 48%. Durllabhganj has an average literacy rate of 79%, higher than the national average of 59.5%: male literacy is 82% and, female literacy is 75%. In Durllabhganj, 12% of the population is under 6 years of age.

.*For language details see Garhbeta III#Language and religion

== Infrastructure ==
According to the District Census Handbook 2011, Paschim Medinipur, Durlabhganj covered an area of 1.11 km^{2}. Among the civic amenities, it had 3 km roads with open drains, the protected water supply involved overhead tank, tap water from treated sources, borewell, tubewell. It had 1,250 domestic electric connections, 28 road lighting points. Among the medical facilities it had 1 hospital. Among the educational facilities it had were 4 primary schools, 1 secondary school, 1 senior secondary school. It had 1 non-formal education centre (Sarba Siksha Abhiyan). Durlabhganj has a chilling plant. It has branch offices of 2 nationalised banks and 1 non-agricultural credit society.
