= Satbankura =

Satbankura Chandrakona Road
- Village
- Location in West Bengal, India Satbankura (India)
- Coordinates: 22°43′19.0″N 87°20′22.3″E
- Country: India
- State: West Bengal
- District: Paschim Medinipur

Population (2011)
  - Total: 3,118

Languages*
  - Official: Bengali, Santali, English
- Time zone: UTC+5:30 (IST)
- PIN: 721253 (Satbankura)
- Telephone/STD code: 03227
- Lok Sabha constituency: Jhargram
- Vidhan Sabha constituency: Salboni
- Website: paschimmedinipur.gov.in

Satbankura is a village and a gram panchayat in the Garhbeta III CD block in the Medinipur Sadar subdivision of the Paschim Medinipur district in the state of West Bengal, India. The headquarters of this block are located here.

== Geography ==
Cities and towns in Medinpur Sadar subdivision of Paschim Medinipur district
M: municipal city/ town, CT: census town, R: rural/ urban centre, H: historical/ religious centre, F: facilities
Owing to space constraints in the small map, the actual locations in a larger map may vary slightly

=== Location ===
Satbankura is located at 22°43′19.0″N 87°20′22.3″E.

=== Area overview ===
Paschim Medinipur district (before separation of Jhargram) had a total forest area of 1,700 km^{2}, accounting for 14.31% of the total forested area of the state. It is obvious from the map of the Midnapore Sadar subdivision, placed alongside, is that there are large stretches of forests in the subdivision. The soil is predominantly lateritic. Around 30% of the population of the district resides in this subdivision. 13.95% of the population lives in urban areas and 86.05% lives in the rural areas.

Note: The map alongside presents some of the notable locations in the subdivision. All places marked in the map are linked in the larger full screen map.

== Demographics ==
According to the 2011 Census of India Satbankura had a total population of 3,118 of which 1,574 (50%) were males and 1,544 (50%) were females. Population in the age range 0–6 years was 398. The total number of literate persons in Satbankura was 1,857 (59.56% of the population over 6 years).

.*For language details see Garhbeta III#Language and religion

== Civic administration ==
=== CD block HQ ===
The headquarters of Garhbeta III block are located at Satbankura.

== Transport ==
NH 14, (old numbering NH 60), running from Morgram to Kharagpur, passes through Satbankura.

== Education ==
Gourav Guin Memorial College was established at Chandrakona Road, PO Satbankura in 2008. Affiliated with Vidyasagar University, it offers honours courses in Bengal, English and history and a general course in arts.
