= Thakurdas Mahata =

Indian politician

Thakurdas Mahata (born 31 December 1930) was an Indian politician, belonging to the Communist Party of India. He was born in Khayerdanga (Midnapore District). He was the son of Baikunthanath Mahata. Mahata received education at Bhimpore Santal High School and Midnapore College, obtaining a B.A. (Hons.) degree and a diploma in Physical Education. He worked as a school teacher He joined the Communist Party in 1956. He was active in the struggle against the proposed merger of West Bengal and Bihar and took part in the food movement and the struggles of the secondary school teachers.

Mahata stood as the CPI candidate in the Salboni constituency in the 1971 West Bengal Legislative Assembly election, finishing in second place with 9,628 votes (20.06%). The following year he won the Salboni seat in the 1972 West Bengal Legislative Assembly election, obtaining 21,281 votes (48.18%). He lost the Salboni seat in the 1977 West Bengal Legislative Assembly election, finishing in third place with 6,152 votes (13.58%).

Thakurdas Mahata lived in Patajharia village.
