= Amlagora =

- Census Town
- Location in West Bengal, India Amlagora (India)
- Coordinates: 22°51′03.6″N 87°20′02.4″E
- Country: India
- State: West Bengal
- District: Paschim Medinipur

Population (2011)
  - Total: 5,165

Languages
  - Official: Bengali, English
- Time zone: UTC+5:30 (IST)
- PIN: 721121
- Telephone code: 03227
- Vehicle registration: WB
- Lok Sabha constituency: Jhargram
- Vidhan Sabha constituency: Garbeta
- Website: paschimmedinipur.gov.in

Amlagora is a census town in the Garhbeta I CD block in the Medinipur Sadar subdivision of the Paschim Medinipur district in the state of West Bengal, India.

== Geography ==
Cities and towns in Medinpur Sadar subdivision of Paschim Medinipur district
M: municipal city/ town, CT: census town, R: rural/ urban centre, H: historical/ religious centre, F: facilities
Owing to space constraints in the small map, the actual locations in a larger map may vary slightly

=== Location ===
Amlagora is located at 22°51′03.6″N 87°20′02.4″E.

=== Area overview ===
Paschim Medinipur district (before separation of Jhargram) had a total forest area of 1,700 km^{2}, accounting for 14.31% of the total forested area of the state. It is obvious from the map of the Midnapore Sadar subdivision, placed alongside, is that there are large stretches of forests in the subdivision. The soil is predominantly lateritic. Around 30% of the population of the district resides in this subdivision. 13.95% of the population lives in urban areas and 86.05% lives in the rural areas.

Note: The map alongside presents some of the notable locations in the subdivision. All places marked in the map are linked in the larger full screen map.

== Demographics ==
According to the 2011 Census of India Amlagora had a total population of 5,165 of which 2,665 (52%) were males and 2,500 (48%) were females. Population in the age range 0–6 years was 621. The total number of literate persons in Amlagora was 3,463 (67.05% of the population over 6 years).

== Infrastructure ==
According to the District Census Handbook 2011, Paschim Medinipur, Amlagora covered an area of 2.8861 km^{2}. Among the civic amenities, it had 2.5 km roads with both open and covered drains, the protected water supply involved overhead tank, service reservoir, tap water from treated and untreated sources. It had 1,021 domestic electric connections, 37 road lighting points. Among the medical facilities it had 6 medicine shops in the town, the nearest dispensary/ health centre being 0.5 km away. Among the educational facilities it had were 1 primary school, 1 middle school, the nearest secondary/ senior secondary schools at Banerjeedanga 2 km away, the nearest general degree college at Garbeta 1.5 km away. It had 1 special school for the disabled.

== Transport ==
The Garbeta-Hoomgarh-Goaltore-Pirakata Road passes through Amlagora.
