= Keshpur =

- Village
- Location in West Bengal, India Keshpur (India)
- Coordinates: 22°33′16.2″N 87°27′40.1″E
- Country: India
- State: West Bengal
- District: Paschim Medinipur

Population (2011)
  - Total: 4,577

Languages
  - Official: Bengali, English
- Time zone: UTC+5:30 (IST)
- PIN: 721150 (Keshpur)
- Telephone/STD code: 03225
- Lok Sabha constituency: Ghatal
- Vidhan Sabha constituency: Keshpur
- Website: paschimmedinipur.gov.in

Keshpur (formerly Keshpore until 2001) is a village in the Keshpur CD block of Ghatal in the Medinipur Sadar subdivision of the Paschim Medinipur district in the state of West Bengal, India.

== Geography ==
Cities and towns in Medinpur Sadar subdivision of Paschim Medinipur district
M: municipal city/ town, CT: census town, R: rural/ urban centre, H: historical/ religious centre, F: facilities
Owing to space constraints in the small map, the actual locations in a larger map may vary slightly

=== Location ===
Keshpur is located at 22°33′16.2″N 87°27′40.1″E.

=== Area overview ===
Paschim Medinipur district (before separation of Jhargram) had a total forest area of 1,700 km^{2}, accounting for 14.31% of the total forested area of the state. It is obvious from the map of the Midnapore Sadar subdivision, placed alongside, is that there are large stretches of forests in the subdivision. The soil is predominantly lateritic. Around 30% of the population of the district resides in this subdivision. Only 13.95% of the population lives in urban areas and the rest in the rural areas.

Note: The map alongside presents some of the notable locations in the subdivision. All places marked in the map are linked in the larger full screen map.

== Demographics ==
According to the 2011 Census of India Keshpur had a total population of 4,577 of which 2,311 (50%) were males and 2,266 (50%) were females. Population in the age range 0–6 years was 601. The total number of literate persons in Keshpur was 3,242 (70.83% of the population over 6 years).

== Civic administration ==
=== CD block HQ ===
The headquarters of Keshpur block located at Keshpur.

=== Police station ===
Keshpur police station has jurisdiction over a part of Keshpur CD block.

== Transport ==
SH 7 running from Rajgram (in Murshidabad district) to Midnapore (in Paschim Medinipur district) passes through Keshpur .

== Education ==
Sukumar Sengupta Mahavidyalaya was established in 2004 and is affiliated to Vidyasagar University. It offers undergraduate courses in arts and science.

There is one ITI college, named, Keshpur Government ITI. This Industrial Training Institute offer courses in Fitter, Electrician, Electronic Mechanic, Mechanic (Motor Vehicle), Mechanic Diesel, Surveyor, Turner, Welder, and Wireman.

== Healthcare ==
Keshpur Rural Hospital, with 30 beds at Keshpur is the major government medical facility in the Keshpur CD block.
