= Garhbeta III =

- Community development block
- Coordinates: 22.7169400°N 87.3395200°E
- Country: India
- State: West Bengal
- District: Paschim Medinipur

Government
  - Type: Federal democracy

Area
  - Total: 312.82 km^{2} (120.78 sq mi)
- Elevation: 56 m (184 ft)

Population (2011)
  - Total: 169,528
  - Density: 541.93/km^{2} (1,403.6/sq mi)

Languages
  - Official: Bengali, Santali, English
- Time zone: UTC+5:30 (IST)
- PIN: 721253 (Satbankura); 721257 (Nayabasat)
- Area code: 03227
- Vehicle registration: WB-34
- Literacy: 72.21%
- Lok Sabha constituency: Jhargram
- Vidhan Sabha constituency: Salboni
- Website: paschimmedinipur.gov.in

Garhbeta III is a community development block that forms an administrative division in Medinipur Sadar subdivision of Paschim Medinipur district in the Indian state of West Bengal.

== Geography ==
In Garhbeta III CD block 95% of the cultivated area has alluvial soil and 5% has lateritic soil. Garhbeta III CD block is drought prone.

Satbankura, one of the constituent gram panchayats, is located at 22°43′01″N 87°20′22″E.

Garhbeta III CD block is bounded by Garhbeta I CD block in the north, Chandrakona II CD blocks in the east, Keshpur and Salboni CD blocks in the south and Garhbeta II CD block in the west.

It is located 48 km from Midnapore, the district headquarters.

Garhbeta III CD block has an area of 312.12 km^{2}. It has 1 panchayat samity, 8 gram panchayats, 115 gram sansads (village councils), 232 mouzas and 188 inhabited villages. Garhbeta and Goaltore police stations serve this block. Headquarters of this CD block is at Satbankura.

Garhbeta III CD block had a forest cover of 6,242 hectares, against a total geographical area of 30,308 hectares in 2005-06.

Gram panchayats of Garhbeta III block/ panchayat samiti are: Amsole, Karsa, Nalbana, Nayabasat, Raskundu, Sankarkata, Satbankura and Uriasai.

== Demographics ==
=== Population ===
According to the 2011 Census of India Garhbeta III CD block had a total population of 169,528, of which 148,809 were rural and 20,719 were urban. There were 86,023 (51%) males and 83,505 (49%) females. Population in the age range 0–6 years was 21,215. Scheduled Castes numbered 26,004 (15.34%) and Scheduled Tribes numbered 23,955 (14.13%).

As per the 2001 census, Garhbeta III block had a total population of 145,827, out of which 74,846 were males and 70,981 were females. Garhbeta III block registered a population growth of 23.93 per cent during the 1991-2001 decade. Decadal growth for the combined Midnapore district was 14.87 per cent. Decadal growth in West Bengal was 17.45 per cent.

Census Towns in Garhbeta III CD block are (2011 census figures in brackets): Durllabhganj (6,796), Dwarigeria (7,754) and Naba Kola (6,169).

Large villages (with 4,000+ population) in Garhbeta III CD block are (2011 census figures in brackets): Chhota Tara (4,872), Methia Dahar (4,831) and Bila (4,085).

Other villages in Garhbeta III CD block include (2011 census figures inbrackets): Satbankura (3,118), Naya Basat (3,286), Karsa (1,737), Raskunda (3,238), Uriyashai (1,345), Amsol (1,309) and Nalbona (1,642).

=== Literacy ===
According to the 2011 census the total number of literate persons in Garhbeta III CD block was 108,885 (72.21% of the population over 6 years) out of which males numbered 60,243 (79.89% of the male population over 6 years) and females numbered 48,642 (66.72% of the female population over 6 years).The gender gap in literacy rates was 13.18%.

See also – List of West Bengal districts ranked by literacy rate

Literacy in CD blocks of
Paschim Medinipur district
Jhargram subdivision
Binpur I – 69.74%
Binpur II – 70.46%
Gopiballavpur I – 65.44%
Gopiballavpur II – 71.40%
Jamboni – 72.63%
Jhargram – 72.23%
Nayagram – 63.70%
Sankrail – 73.35%
Medinipur Sadar subdivision
Garhbeta I – 72.21%
Garhbeta II – 75.87%
Garhbeta III – 73.42%
Keshpur – 77.88%
Midnapore Sadar – 70.48%
Salboni – 74.87%
Ghatal subdivision
Chandrakona I – 78.93%
Chandrakona II – 75.96%
Daspur I – 83.99%
Daspur II – 85.62%
Ghatal – 81.08%
Kharagpur subdivision
Dantan I – 73.53%
Dantan II – 82.45%
Debra – 82.03%
Keshiari – 76.78%
Kharagpur I – 77.06%
Kharagpur II – 76.08%
Mohanpur – 80.51%
Narayangarh – 78.31%
Pingla – 83.57%
Sabang – 86.84%
2011 Census: CD Block Wise

Primary Census Abstract Data

=== Language and religion ===
Religion in Garhbeta III CD block (2011)
Hinduism	67.60%
Islam	27.33%
Other (tribal religion)	4.92%
Other or not stated	0.15%

In the 2011 census Hindus numbered 114,602 and formed 67.60% of the population in Garhbeta III CD block. Muslims numbered 46,330 and formed 27.33% of the population. Others numbered 8,596 and formed 5.07% of the population. Others include Addi Bassi, Marang Boro, Santal, Saranath, Sari Dharma, Sarna, Alchchi, Bidin, Sant, Saevdharm, Seran, Saran, Sarin, Kheria, Christians and other religious communities. In 2001, Hindus were 70.82%, Muslims 24.77% and tribal religions 4.32% of the population respectively.

Languages of Garhbeta III CD block (2011)
1. Bengali (86.3%)
2. Santali (12.1%)
3. Kurmali (0.95%)
4. Others (0.64%)

At the time of the 2011 census, 86.31% of the population spoke Bengali, 12.10% Santali and 0.95% Kurmali as their first language.

== BPL families ==
In Garhbeta III CD block 31.95% families were living below poverty line in 2007.

According to the District Human Development Report of Paschim Medinipur: The 29 CD blocks of the district were classified into four categories based on the poverty ratio. Nayagram, Binpur II and Jamboni CD blocks have very high poverty levels (above 60%). Kharagpur I, Kharagpur II, Sankrail, Garhbeta II, Pingla and Mohanpur CD blocks have high levels of poverty (50-60%), Jhargram, Midnapore Sadar, Dantan I, Gopiballavpur II, Binpur I, Dantan II, Keshiari, Chandrakona I, Gopiballavpur I, Chandrakona II, Narayangarh, Keshpur, Ghatal, Sabang, Garhbeta I, Salboni, Debra and Garhbeta III CD blocks have moderate levels of poverty (25-50%) and Daspur II and Daspur I CD blocks have low levels of poverty (below 25%).

== Economy ==
=== Infrastructure ===
192 or 83% of mouzas in Garhbeta III CD block were electrified by 31 March 2014.

194 mouzas in Garhbeta III CD block had drinking water facilities in 2013-14. There were 121 fertiliser depots, 135 seed stores and 35 fair price shops in the CD block.

=== Agriculture ===
Persons engaged in agriculture
in Garhbeta III CD block
1. Bargadars (4.90%)
2. Patta holders (25.8%)
3. Small farmers (3.65%)
4. Marginal farmers (25.2%)
5. Agricultural labourers (40.5%)

Although the Bargadari Act of 1950 recognised the rights of bargadars to a higher share of crops from the land that they tilled, it was not implemented. Large tracts, beyond the prescribed limit of land ceiling, remained with the rich landlords. From 1977 onwards major land reforms took place in West Bengal. Land in excess of land ceiling was acquired and distributed amongst the peasants. Following land reforms land ownership pattern has undergone transformation. In 2013–14, persons engaged in agriculture in Garhbeta III CD block could be classified as follows: bargadars 4.90%, patta (document) holders 25.76%, small farmers (possessing land between 1 and 2 hectares) 3.65%, marginal farmers (possessing land up to 1 hectare) 25.22% and agricultural labourers 40.48%.

In 2005-06 the nett cropped area in Garhbeta III CD block was 14,500 hectares and the area in which more than one crop was grown was 12,411 hectares.

The extension of irrigation has played a role in growth of the predominantly agricultural economy. In 2013–14, the total area irrigated in Garhbeta III CD block was 6,585 hectares, out of which 100 hectares were irrigated by canal water, 350 hectares by tank water, 2,325 hectares by deep tubewells, 2,600 hectares by shallow tube wells, 350 hectares by river lift irrigation, 25 hectares by open dug wells and 260 hectares by other methods.

In 2013–14, Garhbeta III CD block produced 10,930 tonnes of Aman paddy, the main winter crop, from 6,163 hectares, 1,745 tonnes of Boro paddy (spring crop) from 731 hectares, 356 tonnes of wheat from 218 hectares and 36,288 tonnes of potatoes from 3,500 hectares. It also produced oilseeds.

=== Banking ===
In 2013–14, Garhbeta III CD block had offices of 11 commercial banks and 1 gramin bank.

== Transport ==
Garhbeta III CD block has 29 originating/ terminating bus routes.

The Kharagpur-Bankura-Adra line of South Eastern Railway passes through this CD block. There is a station named as Chandrakona Road located at Daradabcha mouza.

State Highway 4 running from Jhalda (in Purulia district) to Digha (in Purba Medinipur district) passes through this block.

== Education ==
In 2013–14, Garhbeta III CD block had 122 primary schools with 10,623 students, 15 middle schools with 2,320 students, 10 high school with 8,405 students and 8 higher secondary schools with 10,110 students. Garhbeta III CD block had 1 general college with 710 students and 311 institutions for special and non-formal education with 13,590 students.

The United Nations Development Programme considers the combined primary and secondary enrolment ratio as the simple indicator of educational achievement of the children in the school going age. The infrastructure available is important. In Garhbeta III CD block out of the total 122 primary schools in 2008–2009, 21 had pucca buildings, 49 partially pucca, and 52 multiple type.

Gourav Guin Memorial College was established at Chandrakona Road, PO Satbankura in 2008.

== Healthcare ==
In 2014, Garhbeta III CD block had 1 hospital, 1 rural hospital, 2 primary health centres and 1 private nursing home with total 390 beds and 9 doctors. It had 24 family welfare sub-centres and 1 family welfare centre. 5,405 patients were treated indoor and 105,620 patients were treated outdoor in the hospitals, health centres and subcentres of the CD block.

Dwarigeria Rural Hospital, with 30 beds at Dwarigeria, is the major government medical facility in the Garhbeta III CD block. There are primary health centres at : Chottotara (PO Guiadaha) (with 10 beds) and Nayabasat (with 4 beds).
