= Keshpur (community development block) =

- Community development block
- Coordinates: 22.554497°N 87.461149°E
- Country: India
- State: West Bengal
- District: Paschim Medinipur

Government
  - Type: Federal democracy

Area
  - Total: 483.15 km^{2} (186.55 sq mi)
- Elevation: 43 m (141 ft)

Population (2011)
  - Total: 339,258
  - Density: 702.18/km^{2} (1,818.6/sq mi)

Languages
  - Official: Bengali, English
- Time zone: UTC+5:30 (IST)
- PIN: 721150 (Keshpur); 721122 (Anandapur)
- Area code: 03225
- Vehicle registration: WB-34
- Literacy: 85.24%
- Lok Sabha constituency: Ghatal
- Vidhan Sabha constituency: Keshpur
- Website: paschimmedinipur.gov.in

Keshpur is a community development block that forms an administrative division in Medinipur Sadar subdivision of Paschim Medinipur district in the Indian state of West Bengal.

== History ==
=== Electoral area control ===
After the 1998 panchayat elections, the Trinamool Congress started from this one-horse town, a programme to mobilise the surrounding villagers. It meant challenging the CPI(M)'s domination over the electoral process. It is widely suspected that particularly in the rural areas it followed a regime perfected by them in which the non-party voters were virtually debarred from voting. The Keshpur rebels began questioning this. From 1998 Keshpur was caught in bloody clashes between the CPI(M) and the Trinamul Congress over control of the area. Keshpur became a place synonymous with political vendetta and bloodshed. As of 2016, Keshpur has continued with its political killing fields, the activities quite often spilling over to neighbouring areas such as Garhbeta.

== Geography ==
In Keshpur CD block 75% of the cultivated area has alluvial soil and 25% has lateritic soil. Keshpur CD block is drought prone.

Keshpur is located at 22°33′16″N 87°27′40″E.

Keshpur CD block is bounded by Garhbeta III and Chandrakona II CD blocks in the north, Chandrakona I, Daspur I and Debra CD blocks in the east, Kharagpur II and Midnapore Sadar CD blocks in the south and Salboni CD block in the west.

It is located 24 km from Midnapore, the district headquarters.

Keshpur CD block has an area of 483.15 km^{2}. It has 1 panchayat samity, 15 gram panchayats, 230 gram sansads (village councils), 634 mouzas and 570 inhabited villages. Keshpur and Anandapur police stations serve this block. Headquarters of this CD block is at Keshpur.

Keshpur CD block had a forest cover of 2,070 hectares, against a total geographical area of 47,567 hectares in 2005–06.

Gram panchayats of Keshpur block/ panchayat samiti are: Amanpur, Amarkuchi, Anandapur, Dhalhara, Enayatpur, Golar, Jagganathpur, Jhentla, Jorakeudi-Solidiha, Kalagram, Keshpur, Mugbasan, Sarishakhola, Sirsa and Teghori.

== Demographics ==
=== Population ===
According to the 2011 Census of India, Keshpur CD block had a total population of 339,248, all of which were rural. There were 173,504 (51%) males and 165,744 (49%) females. Population in the age range 0–6 years was 44,940. Scheduled Castes numbered 89,726 (26.45%) and Scheduled Tribes numbered 19,616 (5.78%).

As per 2001 census, Keshpur block had a total population of 288,494, out of which 147,743 were males and 140,751 were females. Keshpur block registered a population growth of 19.37 per cent during the 1991-2001 decade. Decadal growth for the combined Midnapore district was 14.87 per cent. Decadal growth in West Bengal was 17.45 per cent.

Large villages (with 4,000+ population) in Keshpur CD block are (2011 census figures in brackets): Keshpur (4,577), Mugbasan (4,838) and Anandapur (11,461).

Other villages in Keshpur CD block include (2011 census figures in brackets): Enayatpur (1,478), Sarisha Khola (1,957), Amarkuchi (2,598), Teghari (1,393), Jagannathpur (2,932), Golar (2,023), Amanpur (1,707), Jorakendi (719), Shirsha (611), Kalagram (1,937) and Dhalhara (822).

=== Literacy ===
As per the 2011 census the total number of literates in Keshpur CD block was 229,218 (85.24% of the population over 6 years) out of which males numbered 128,345 (85.24% of the male population over 6 years) and females numbered 100,873 (70.18% of the female population over 6 years). The gender gap in literacy rates was 15.06%.

See also – List of West Bengal districts ranked by literacy rate

Literacy in CD blocks of
Paschim Medinipur district
Jhargram subdivision
Binpur I – 69.74%
Binpur II – 70.46%
Gopiballavpur I – 65.44%
Gopiballavpur II – 71.40%
Jamboni – 72.63%
Jhargram – 72.23%
Nayagram – 63.70%
Sankrail – 73.35%
Medinipur Sadar subdivision
Garhbeta I – 72.21%
Garhbeta II – 75.87%
Garhbeta III – 73.42%
Keshpur – 77.88%
Midnapore Sadar – 70.48%
Salboni – 74.87%
Ghatal subdivision
Chandrakona I – 78.93%
Chandrakona II – 75.96%
Daspur I – 83.99%
Daspur II – 85.62%
Ghatal – 81.08%
Kharagpur subdivision
Dantan I – 73.53%
Dantan II – 82.45%
Debra – 82.03%
Keshiari – 76.78%
Kharagpur I – 77.06%
Kharagpur II – 76.08%
Mohanpur – 80.51%
Narayangarh – 78.31%
Pingla – 83.57%
Sabang – 86.84%
2011 Census: CD Block Wise

Primary Census Abstract Data

=== Language and religion ===
Religion in Keshpur CD block (2011)
Hinduism	71.95%
Islam	27.65%
Other or not stated	0.49%

In the 2011 census Hindus numbered 248,550 and formed 71.95% of the population in Keshpur CD block. Muslims numbered 95,029 and formed 27.65% of the population. Others numbered 1,669 and formed 0.49% of the population. Others include Addi Bassi, Marang Boro, Santal, Saranath, Sari Dharma, Sarna, Alchchi, Bidin, Sant, Saevdharm, Seran, Saran, Sarin, Kheria, Christians and other religious communities. In 2001, Hindus were 72.52% and Muslims 26.64% of the population respectively.

Languages of Keshpur CD block (2011)
1. Bengali (95.1%)
2. Santali (4.40%)
3. Others (0.49%)

At the time of the 2011 census, 95.11% of the population spoke Bengali and 4.40% Santali as their first language.

== BPL families ==
In Keshpur CD block 39.90% families were living below poverty line in 2007.

According to the District Human Development Report of Paschim Medinipur: The 29 CD blocks of the district were classified into four categories based on the poverty ratio. Nayagram, Binpur II and Jamboni CD blocks have very high poverty levels (above 60%). Kharagpur I, Kharagpur II, Sankrail, Garhbeta II, Pingla and Mohanpur CD blocks have high levels of poverty (50-60%), Jhargram, Midnapore Sadar, Dantan I, Gopiballavpur II, Binpur I, Dantan II, Keshiari, Chandrakona I, Gopiballavpur I, Chandrakona II, Narayangarh, Keshpur, Ghatal, Sabang, Garhbeta I, Salboni, Debra and Garhbeta III CD blocks have moderate levels of poverty (25-50%) and Daspur II and Daspur I CD blocks have low levels of poverty (below 25%).

== Economy ==
=== Infrastructure ===
562 or 89% of mouzas in Keshpur CD block were electrified by 31 March 2014.

564 mouzas in Keshpur CD block had drinking water facilities in 2013–14. There were 190 fertiliser depots, 85 seed stores and 61 fair price shops in the CD block.

=== Agriculture ===
Persons engaged in agriculture
in Keshpur CD block
1. Bargadars (8.80%)
2. Patta holders (30.6%)
3. Small farmers (3.46%)
4. Marginal farmers (22.2%)
5. Agricultural labourers (34.9%)

Although the Bargadari Act of 1950 recognised the rights of bargadars to a higher share of crops from the land that they tilled, it was not implemented fully. Large tracts, beyond the prescribed limit of land ceiling, remained with the rich landlords. From 1977 onwards major land reforms took place in West Bengal. Land in excess of land ceiling was acquired and distributed amongst the peasants. Following land reforms land ownership pattern has undergone transformation. In 2013–14, persons engaged in agriculture in Keshpur CD block could be classified as follows: bargadars 8.80%, patta (document) holders 30.65%, small farmers (possessing land between 1 and 2 hectares) 3.46%, marginal farmers (possessing land up to 1 hectare) 22.21% and agricultural labourers 34.88%.

In 2005-06 the nett cropped area in Keshpur CD block was 36,219 hectares and the area in which more than one crop was grown was 24,526 hectares.

The extension of irrigation has played a role in growth of the predominantly agricultural economy. In 2013–14, the total area irrigated in Keshpur CD block was 31,965 hectares, out of which 2,500 hectares were irrigated by canal water, 3,000 hectares by tank water, 12,575 hectares by deep tubewells, 13,300 hectares by shallow tube wells, 540 hectares by river lift irrigation, 10 hectares by open dug wells and 50 hectares by other methods.

In 2013–14, Keshpur CD block produced 3,599 tonnes of Aman paddy, the main winter crop, from 3,064 hectares, 474 tonnes of Aus paddy (summer crop) from 229 hectares, 39,108 tonnes of Boro paddy (spring crop) from 14,671 hectares, 1,493 tonnes of wheat from 717 hectares, 3,557 tonnes of jute from 228 hectares and 89,230 tonnes of potatoes from 7,551 hectares. It also produced pulses and oilseeds.

=== Banking ===
In 2013–14, Keshpur CD block had offices of 17 commercial banks and 1 gramin bank.

== Transport ==
Keshpur CD block has 3 ferry services and 19 originating/ terminating bus routes. The nearest railway station is 22 km from the CD block headquarters.

== Education ==
In 2013–14, Keshpur CD block had 247 primary schools with 21,663 students, 30 middle schools with 3,788 students, 15 high schools with 13,099 students and 25 higher secondary schools with 25,553 students. Keshpur CD block had 1 general college with 1,181 students and 725 institutions for special and non-formal education with 34,391 students.

The United Nations Development Programme considers the combined primary and secondary enrolment ratio as the simple indicator of educational achievement of the children in the school going age. The infrastructure available is important. In Keshpur CD block out of the total 247 primary schools in 2008–2009, 87 had pucca buildings, 66 partially pucca, 1 kucha and 93 multiple type.

Sukumar Sengupta Mahavidyalaya is a coeducational college at Keshpur established in 2004. It is affiliated to Vidyasagar University and offers honours courses in Bengali, English, Sanskrit, geography, history, physics, chemistry and mathematics.

There is also a government ITI college, named, Keshpur Government ITI in this block. This Industrial Training Institute offer courses in Fitter, Electrician, Electronic Mechanic, Mechanic (Motor Vehicle), Mechanic Diesel, Surveyor, Turner, Welder, and Wireman.

== Healthcare ==
In 2014, Keshpur CD block had 1 rural hospital, 3 primary health centres, and 3 private nursing homes with total 82 beds and 9 doctors. It had 49 family welfare sub centres and 1 family welfare centre. 9,597 patients were treated indoor and 218,960 patients were treated outdoor in the hospitals, health centres and subcentres of the CD block.

Keshpur Rural Hospital, with 30 beds at Keshpur is the major government medical facility in the Keshpur CD block. There are primary health centres at Dhalhara (PO Pursura) (with 6 beds), Mahaboni (PO Mohabani) (with 10 beds) and Anandapur (with 6 beds).
