= Garhbeta II =

- Community development block
- Coordinates: 22.710°N 87.171°E
- Country: India
- State: West Bengal
- District: Paschim Medinipur

Government
  - Type: Federal democracy

Area
  - Total: 392.55 km^{2} (151.56 sq mi)
- Elevation: 38 m (125 ft)

Population (2011)
  - Total: 148,410
  - Density: 378.07/km^{2} (979.19/sq mi)

Languages
  - Official: Bengali, Santali, English
- Time zone: UTC+5:30 (IST)
- PIN: 721228 (Pingboni); 721128 (Goaltore)
- Area code: 03227
- ISO 3166 code: IN-WB
- Vehicle registration: WB-34
- Literacy: 75.87%
- Lok Sabha constituency: Jhargram
- Vidhan Sabha constituency: Garbeta, Salboni
- Website: paschimmedinipur.gov.in

Garhbeta II is a community development block that forms an administrative division in Medinipur Sadar subdivision of Paschim Medinipur district in the Indian state of West Bengal.

== History ==
=== Red corridor ===
106 districts spanning 10 states across India, described as being part of the Left Wing Extremism activities, constitutes the Red corridor. In West Bengal the districts of Pashim Medinipur, Bankura, Purulia and Birbhum are part of the Red corridor. However, as of July 2016, there had been no reported incidents of Maoist-related activities in these districts for the previous 4 years. In the period 2009-2011, LWE violence resulted in more than 500 deaths and a similar number missing in Paschim Medinipur district.

The Lalgarh movement, which started attracting attention after the failed assassination attempt on Buddhadeb Bhattacharjee, then chief minister of West Bengal, in the Salboni area of Paschim Medinipur district, on 2 November 2008 and the police action that followed, had also spread over to these areas. The movement was not just a political struggle but an armed struggle that concurrently took the look of a social struggle. A large number of CPI (M) activists were killed. Although the epi-centre of the movement was Lalgarh, it was spread across 19 police stations in three adjoining districts – Paschim Medinipur, Bankura and Purulia, all thickly forested and near the border with Jharkhand. The deployment of CRPF and other forces started on 11 June 2009. The movement came to an end after the 2011 state assembly elections and change of government in West Bengal. The death of Kishenji, the Maoist commander, on 24 November 2011 was the last major landmark.

From 2009 Maoist violence had rapidly spread across eleven western CD blocks of the district: Binpur I, Binpur II, Salboni, Garhbeta II, Jamboni, Jhargram, Midnapore Sadar, Gopiballavpur I, Gopiballavpur II, Sankrail and Nayagram.

== Geography ==
In Garhbeta II CD block 90% of the cultivated area has alluvial soil and 10% has lateritic soil. Garhbeta II CD block is drought prone.

Goaltore, a constituent panchayat of Garhbeta II CD block, is located at 22°42′36″N 87°10′16″E.

Garhbeta II CD block is bounded by Taldangra and Simlapal CD blocks in Bankura district in the north, Garhbeta I and Garhbeta III CD blocks in the east, Salboni CD block in the south and Sarenga CD block in Bankura district in the west.

It is located 53 km from Midnapore, the district headquarters.

Garhbeta II CD block has an area of 392.55 km^{2}. It has 1 panchayat samity, 10 gram panchayats, 110 gram sansads (village councils), 334 mouzas and 264 inhabited villages. Garhbeta and Goaltore police stations serve this block. Headquarters of this CD block is at Goaltore.

Garhbeta II CD block had a forest cover of 7,460 hectares, against a total geographical area of 43,970 hectares in 2005-06.

Gram panchayats of Garhbeta II block/ panchayat samiti are: Amlasuli, Goaltore, Gohaldanga, Jirapara, Jogardnga, Makli, Patharpara, Piasala, Pingboni and Saraboth.

== Demographics ==
=== Population ===
According to the 2011 Census of India Garhbeta II CD block had a total population of 148,410, all of which were rural. There were 75,165 (51%) males and 73,245 (49%) females. Population in the age range 0–6 years was 17,102. Scheduled Castes numbered 39,301 (26.48%) and Scheduled Tribes numbered 29,669 (19.99%).

As per the 2001 census, Garhbeta II block had a total population of 131,085, out of which 66,954 were males and 64,131 were females. Garhbeta II block registered a population growth of 18.59 per cent during the 1991-2001 decade. Decadal growth for the combined Midnapore district was 14.87 per cent. Decadal growth in West Bengal was 17.45 per cent.

Villages in Garhbeta II CD block include (2011 census figures in brackets): Goaltore (693), Makli (1,224), Pingboni (2,366), Amlasuli (2,169), Piasala (1,848), Gohaldanga (1,577), Sarbot (423), Jirapara (1,455), Patharpara (308) and Jagardanga (1,967).

=== Literacy ===
According to the 2011 census, the total number of literate persons in Garhbeta II CD block was 99,621 (75.87% of the population over 6 years) out of which males numbered 55,877 (84.14% of the male population over 6 years) and females numbered 43,744 (67.41% of the female population over 6 years).The gender gap in literacy rates was 16.73%.

See also – List of West Bengal districts ranked by literacy rate

Literacy in CD blocks of
Paschim Medinipur district
Jhargram subdivision
Binpur I – 69.74%
Binpur II – 70.46%
Gopiballavpur I – 65.44%
Gopiballavpur II – 71.40%
Jamboni – 72.63%
Jhargram – 72.23%
Nayagram – 63.70%
Sankrail – 73.35%
Medinipur Sadar subdivision
Garhbeta I – 72.21%
Garhbeta II – 75.87%
Garhbeta III – 73.42%
Keshpur – 77.88%
Midnapore Sadar – 70.48%
Salboni – 74.87%
Ghatal subdivision
Chandrakona I – 78.93%
Chandrakona II – 75.96%
Daspur I – 83.99%
Daspur II – 85.62%
Ghatal – 81.08%
Kharagpur subdivision
Dantan I – 73.53%
Dantan II – 82.45%
Debra – 82.03%
Keshiari – 76.78%
Kharagpur I – 77.06%
Kharagpur II – 76.08%
Mohanpur – 80.51%
Narayangarh – 78.31%
Pingla – 83.57%
Sabang – 86.84%
2011 Census: CD Block Wise

Primary Census Abstract Data

=== Language and religion ===
Religion in Garhbeta II CD block (2011)
Hinduism	75.36%
Other (tribal religion)	20.48%
Islam	3.80%
Other or not stated	0.36%

In the 2011 census Hindus numbered 111,848 and formed 75.36% of the population in Garhbeta II CD block. Muslims numbered 5,637 and formed 3.80% of the population. Others numbered 30,925 and formed 20.84% of the population. Others include Addi Bassi, Marang Boro, Santal, Saranath, Sari Dharma, Sarna, Alchchi, Bidin, Sant, Saevdharm, Seran, Saran, Sarin, Kheria, Christians and other religious communities. In 2001, Hindus were 77.23%, Muslims 3.36% and tribal religions 19.04% of the population respectively.

Languages of Garhbeta II CD block (2011)
1. Bengali (76.0%)
2. Santali (19.7%)
3. Kurmali (4.12%)
4. Others (0.16%)

At the time of the 2011 census, 76.01% of the population spoke Bengali, 19.71% Santali and 4.12% Kurmali as their first language.

== BPL families ==
In Garhbeta II CD block 50.76% families were living below poverty line in 2007.

According to the District Human Development Report of Paschim Medinipur: The 29 CD blocks of the district were classified into four categories based on the poverty ratio. Nayagram, Binpur II and Jamboni CD blocks have very high poverty levels (above 60%). Kharagpur I, Kharagpur II, Sankrail, Garhbeta II, Pingla and Mohanpur CD blocks have high levels of poverty (50-60%), Jhargram, Midnapore Sadar, Dantan I, Gopiballavpur II, Binpur I, Dantan II, Keshiari, Chandrakona I, Gopiballavpur I, Chandrakona II, Narayangarh, Keshpur, Ghatal, Sabang, Garhbeta I, Salboni, Debra and Garhbeta III CD blocks have moderate levels of poverty (25-50%) and Daspur II and Daspur I CD blocks have low levels of poverty (below 25%).

== Economy ==
=== Infrastructure ===
265 or 79% of mouzas in Garhbeta II CD block were electrified by 31 March 2014.

275 mouzas in Garhbeta II CD block had drinking water facilities in 2013-14. There were 96 fertiliser depots, 105 seed stores and 35 fair price shops in the CD block.

=== Agriculture ===
Persons engaged in agriculture
in Garhbeta II CD block
1. Bargadars (3.31%)
2. Patta holders (30.1%)
3. Small farmers (3.24%)
4. Marginal farmers (23.9%)
5. Agricultural labourers (39.4%)

Although the Bargadari Act of 1950 recognised the rights of bargadars to a higher share of crops from the land that they tilled, it was not implemented fully. Large tracts, beyond the prescribed limit of land ceiling, remained with the rich landlords. From 1977 onwards major land reforms took place in West Bengal. Land in excess of land ceiling was acquired and distributed amongst the peasants. Following land reforms land ownership pattern has undergone transformation. In 2013-14, persons engaged in agriculture in Garhbeta II CD block could be classified as follows: bargadars 3.31%, patta (document) holders 30.11%, small farmers (possessing land between 1 and 2 hectares) 3.24%, marginal farmers (possessing land up to 1 hectare) 23.90% and agricultural labourers 39.44%.

In 2005-06 the net cropped area in Garhbeta II CD block was 15,100 hectares and the area in which more than one crop was grown was 12,527 hectares.

The extension of irrigation has played a role in growth of the predominantly agricultural economy. In 2013-14, the total area irrigated in Garhbeta II CD block was 15,545 hectares, out of which 10,000 hectares were irrigated by canal water, 1,070 hectares by tank water, 530 hectares by deep tubewells, 2,540 hectares by shallow tube wells, 300 hectares by river lift irrigation, 705 hectares by open dug wells and 400 hectares by other methods.

In 2013-14, Garhbeta II CD block produced 36,526 tonnes of Aman paddy, the main winter crop, from 20,990 hectares, 5,268 tonnes of Aus paddy (summer crop) from 1,800 hectares, 7,929 tonnes of Boro paddy (spring crop) from 2,450 hectares, 721 tonnes of wheat from 342 hectares and 67,422 tonnes of potatoes from 5,740 hectares. It also produced oilseeds.

=== Banking ===
In 2013-14, Garhbeta II CD block had offices of 11 commercial banks and 1 gramin bank. At Goaltore available United bank of India with A.T.M facility, at Debgram (2 km from Goaltore) State bank of India and at Pingboni Punjab National Bank with A.T.M also.

== Transport ==
Garhbeta II CD block has 1 ferry service and 16 originating/ terminating bus routes. The nearest railway station is 19 km from the CD block headquarters.

State Highway 4 running from Jhalda (in Purulia district) to Digha (in Purba Medinipur district) passes through this block.

== Education ==
In 2013-14, Garhbeta II CD block had 166 primary schools with 9,775 students, 15 middle schools with 2,379 students, 1 high school with 1,423 students and 16 higher secondary schools with 17,658 students. Garhbeta II CD block had 1 general college with 650 students and 378 institutions for special and non-formal education with 10,126 students.

The United Nations Development Programme considers the combined primary and secondary enrolment ratio as the simple indicator of educational achievement of the children in the school going age. The infrastructure available is important. In Garhbeta II CD block out of the total 166 primary schools in 2008-2009, 69 had pucca buildings, 21 partially pucca, 2 kacha and 74 multiple type.

The Santal Bidroha Sardha Satabarsiki Mahavidyalaya is a coeducational college at Goaltore, established in 2005. It offers honours courses in Bengali, Santali, Sanskrit, English, geography, history, political science, philosophy, mathematics, chemistry, nutrition and zoology.

== Healthcare ==
In 2014, Garhbeta II CD block had 1 rural hospital and 2 primary health centres with total 44 beds and 7 doctors. It had 28 family welfare sub centres and 1 family welfare centre. 2,661 patients were treated indoor and 100,490 patients were treated outdoor in the hospitals, health centres and subcentres of the CD block.

Kewakole Rural Hospital, with 30 beds at Goaltore, is the major government medical facility in the Garhbeta II CD block. There are primary health centres at Charubala (PO Bulanpur) (with 4 beds) and Babuidanga (PO Amlasuli) (with 10 beds).
