= Goaltore =

- Village

- Location in West Bengal, India Goaltore (India)
- Coordinates: 22.70842°N 87.17136°E
- Country: India
- State: West Bengal
- District: Paschim Medinipur
- Subdivision: Medinipur Sadar

Government
  - Body: Gram panchayat

Population (2011)
  - Total: 693

Languages*
  - Official: Bengali, Santali, English
- Time zone: UTC+5:30 (IST)
- PIN: 721128
- ISO 3166 code: IN-WB
- Vehicle registration: WB
- Website: wb.gov.in

Goaltore, also spelled Goaltor, is a village in the Garhbeta II CD block in the Medinipur Sadar subdivision of the Paschim Medinipur district in West Bengal, India.

== Geography ==
Cities and towns in Medinpur Sadar subdivision of Paschim Medinipur district
M: municipal city/ town, CT: census town, R: rural/ urban centre, H: historical/ religious centre, F: facilities
Owing to space constraints in the small map, the actual locations in a larger map may vary slightly

=== Location ===
Goaltore is located at 22.70842°N 87.17136°E.

=== Area overview ===
There are large forested areas in the subdivision. The soil is predominantly lateritic. Around 30% of the population of the district resides in this subdivision. Only 13.95% of the population of this subdivision lives in urban areas, and the rest in rural areas.

Note: The map alongside presents some of the notable locations in the subdivision. All places marked in the map are linked in the larger full screen map.

== Demographics ==
According to the 2011 Census of India, Goaltore had a total population of 693, of which 356 (51%) were males and 337 (49%) females. There were 48 persons in the age range of 0–6 years. The total number of literate persons in Goaltore was 606 (93.95% of the population over 6 years).

.*For language details see Garhbeta II#Language and religion

== Civic administration ==
=== CD block HQ ===
The headquarters of Garhbeta II block are located at Goaltore.

=== Police station ===
Goaltore police station has jurisdiction over parts of Garhbeta I, Garhbeta II, and Garhbeta III CD blocks.

== Economy ==
The West Bengal Government has offered 1,000 acres of land in Goaltore for industry. The West Bengal State Electricity Distribution Company Limited (WBSEDCL) has developed utility-scale solar power infrastructure in Goaltore. Phase I of the project, a 112.50 MW solar power plant, was commissioned in September 2024. In February 2026, WBSEDCL initiated Phase II, comprising a 100 MW solar photovoltaic plant paired with a 25 MW / 100 MWh battery energy storage system (BESS) at an estimated cost of ₹680.78 crore.

== Transport ==
State Highway 4 (West Bengal) running from Jhalda (in Purulia district) to Digha (in Purba Medinipur district) passes through Goaltore.

== Education ==
The Santal Bidroha Sardha Satabarsiki Mahavidyalaya is a coeducational college at Goaltore, established in 2005. It offers honors courses in Bengali, Santali, Sanskrit, English, geography, history, political science, philosophy, mathematics, chemistry, nutrition and zoology.

== Healthcare ==
Kewakole Rural Hospital, with 30 beds, is located in Goaltore and is the major government medical facility in the Garhbeta II CD block.
