= Piasala =

- Village
- Location in West Bengal, India Piasala (India)
- Coordinates: 22°49′41.0″N 87°15′18.6″E
- Country: India
- State: West Bengal
- District: Paschim Medinipur
- Elevation: 38 m (125 ft)

Population (2011)
  - Total: 1,848

Languages*
  - Official: Bengali, Santali, English
- Time zone: UTC+5:30 (IST)
- Lok Sabha constituency: Jhargram
- Vidhan Sabha constituency: Garbeta
- Website: paschimmedinipur.gov.in

Piasala is a village and gram panchayat in Garhbeta II CD Block in Medinipur Sadar subdivision of Paschim Medinipur district in the state of West Bengal, India.

== Geography ==
The area lies south of the Shilabati and is close to Hoomgarh Forest.

== Demographics ==
As per 2011 Census of India Piasala had a total population of 1,848 of which 955 (52%) were males and 893 (48%) were females. Population below 6 years was 211. The total number of literates in Piasala was 1,298 (67.19% of the population over 6 years).

.*For language details see Garhbeta II#Language and religion

== Transport ==
The Garbeta-Hoomgarh-Goaltore-Pirakata Road passes through Piasala.
