= Chandrakona II =

- Community development block
- Coordinates: 22.73°N 87.52°E
- Country: India
- State: West Bengal
- District: Paschim Medinipur

Government
  - Type: Federal democracy

Area
  - Total: 150.44 km^{2} (58.09 sq mi)
- Elevation: 56 m (184 ft)

Population (2011)
  - Total: 123,269
  - Density: 819.39/km^{2} (2,122.2/sq mi)

Languages
  - Official: Bengali, English
- Time zone: UTC+5:30 (IST)
- PIN: 721201 (Chandrakona); 721260 (Bandipur); 721127 (Krishnapur)
- Area code: 03227
- Vehicle registration: WB-34
- Literacy: 76.96%
- Lok Sabha constituency: Arambagh
- Vidhan Sabha constituency: 232 Chandrakona (SC)
- Website: www.paschimmedinipur.gov.in/block/chandrakona2

Chandrakona II is a community development block that forms an administrative division in Ghatal subdivision of Paschim Medinipur district in the Indian state of West Bengal.

== Geography ==
In Chandrakona II CD block is a flat deltaic country intersected by numerous rivers and water courses. 100% of the cultivated area has highly productive alluvial soil.

Chandrakona is located at 22°44′N 87°31′E.

Chandrakona II CD block is bounded by Garhbeta I and Chandrakona I CD blocks in the north, Chandrakona I CD block in the east, Keshpur CD block in the south and Garhbeta III CD block in the west.

It is located 47 km from Midnapore, the district headquarters.

Chandrakona II CD block has an area of 150.44 km^{2}. It has 1 panchayat samity, 6 gram panchayats, 86 gram sansads (village councils), 131 mouzas and 122 inhabited villages. Chandrakona police station serves this block. Headquarters of this CD block is at Chandrakona.

Chandrakona II CD block had a forest cover of 1,050 hectares, against a total geographical area of 17,982 hectares in 2005-06.

Gram panchayats of Chandrakona II block/ panchayat samiti are: Bandipur I, Bandipur II, Basanchhora, Bhagabantapur I, Bhagabantapur II and Kuapur.

== Demographics ==
=== Population ===
According to the 2011 Census of India Chandrakona II CD block had a total population of 123,269, all of which were rural. There were 63,180 (51%) males and 60,089 (49%) females. Population in the age range 0–6 years was 15,231. Scheduled Castes numbered 37,330 (30.28%) and Scheduled Tribes numbered 6,841 (5.55%).

As per the 2001 census, Chandrakona II block had a total population of 106,586, out of which 54,504 were males and 52,083 were females. Chandrakona II block registered a population growth of 18.85 per cent during the 1991-2001 decade. Decadal growth for the combined Midnapore district was 14.87 per cent. Decadal growth in West Bengal was 17.45 per cent.

Large villages (with 4,000+ population) in Chandrakona II CD block are (2011 census figures in brackets): Krishnapur (6,083), Murakata (4,411), Jhakra (4,993) and Bala (4,604).

Other villages in Chandrakona II CD block included (2011 census figures in brackets): Basanchhara (2,128), Bandipur (2,829), Jayantipur (613) and Baikunthapur (877).

=== Literacy ===
As per the 2011 census the total number of literate persons in Chandrakona II CD block was 83,145 (76.96% of the population over 6 years) out of which males numbered 46,086 (83.09% of the male population over 6 years) and females numbered 37,059 (70.49% of the female population over 6 years). The gender gap in literacy rates was 12.60%.

See also – List of West Bengal districts ranked by literacy rate

Literacy in CD blocks of
Paschim Medinipur district
Jhargram subdivision
Binpur I – 69.74%
Binpur II – 70.46%
Gopiballavpur I – 65.44%
Gopiballavpur II – 71.40%
Jamboni – 72.63%
Jhargram – 72.23%
Nayagram – 63.70%
Sankrail – 73.35%
Medinipur Sadar subdivision
Garhbeta I – 72.21%
Garhbeta II – 75.87%
Garhbeta III – 73.42%
Keshpur – 77.88%
Midnapore Sadar – 70.48%
Salboni – 74.87%
Ghatal subdivision
Chandrakona I – 78.93%
Chandrakona II – 75.96%
Daspur I – 83.99%
Daspur II – 85.62%
Ghatal – 81.08%
Kharagpur subdivision
Dantan I – 73.53%
Dantan II – 82.45%
Debra – 82.03%
Keshiari – 76.78%
Kharagpur I – 77.06%
Kharagpur II – 76.08%
Mohanpur – 80.51%
Narayangarh – 78.31%
Pingla – 83.57%
Sabang – 86.84%
2011 Census: CD Block Wise

Primary Census Abstract Data

=== Language and religion ===
Religion in Chandrakona II CD block (2011)
Hinduism	78.22%
Islam	20.64%
Other (tribal religion)	0.78%
Other or not stated	0.36%

In the 2011 census Hindus numbered 96,425 and formed 78.22% of the population in Chandrakona II CD block. Muslims numbered 25,442 and formed 20.64% of the population. Others numbered 1,402 and formed 1.14% of the population. Others include Addi Bassi, Marang Boro, Santal, Saranath, Sari Dharma, Sarna, Alchchi, Bidin, Sant, Saevdharm, Seran, Saran, Sarin, Kheria, Christians and other religious communities. In 2001, Hindus were 79.98%, Muslims 19.01% and tribal religions 0.95% of the population respectively.

Languages of Chandrakona II CD block (2011)
1. Bengali (97.4%)
2. Santali (2.51%)
3. Others (0.08%)

At the time of the 2011 census, 97.41% of the population spoke Bengali and 2.51% Santali as their first language.

== BPL families ==
In Chandrakona II CD block 41.84% families were living below poverty line in 2007.

According to the District Human Development Report of Paschim Medinipur: The 29 CD blocks of the district were classified into four categories based on the poverty ratio. Nayagram, Binpur II and Jamboni CD blocks have very high poverty levels (above 60%). Kharagpur I, Kharagpur II, Sankrail, Garhbeta II, Pingla and Mohanpur CD blocks have high levels of poverty (50-60%), Jhargram, Midnapore Sadar, Dantan I, Gopiballavpur II, Binpur I, Dantan II, Keshiari, Chandrakona I, Gopiballavpur I, Chandrakona II, Narayangarh, Keshpur, Ghatal, Sabang, Garhbeta I, Salboni, Debra and Garhbeta III CD blocks have moderate levels of poverty (25-50%) and Daspur II and Daspur I CD blocks have low levels of poverty (below 25%).

== Economy ==
=== Infrastructure ===
121 or 92% of mouzas in Chandrakona II CD block were electrified by 31 March 2014.

122 mouzas in Chandrakona II CD block had drinking water facilities in 2013-14. There were 73 fertiliser depots, 149 seed stores and 29 fair price shops in the CD block.

=== Agriculture ===
Persons engaged in agriculture
in Chandrakona II CD block
1. Bargadars (8.41%)
2. Patta holders (30.4%)
3. Small farmers (2.94%)
4. Marginal farmers (18.9%)
5. Agricultural labourers (39.3%)

Although the Bargadari Act of 1950 recognised the rights of bargadars to a higher share of crops from the land that they tilled, it was not fully implemented. Large tracts, beyond the prescribed limit of land ceiling, remained with the rich landlords. From 1977 onwards major land reforms took place in West Bengal. Land in excess of land ceiling was acquired and distributed amongst the peasants. Following land reforms land ownership pattern has undergone transformation. In 2013-14, persons engaged in agriculture in Chandrakona II CD block could be classified as follows: bargadars 8.41%, patta (document) holders 30.43%, small farmers (possessing land between 1 and 2 hectares) 2.94%, marginal farmers (possessing land up to 1 hectare) 18.89% and agricultural labourers 39.34%.

In 2005-06 the nett cropped area in Chandrakona II CD block was 13,100 hectares and the area in which more than one crop was grown was 9,326 hectares.

The extension of irrigation has played a role in growth of the predominantly agricultural economy. In 2013-14, the total area irrigated in Chandrakona II CD block was 10,900 hectares, out of which 1,200 hectares were irrigated by tank water, 5,750 hectares by deep tubewells, 2,000 hectares by shallow tubewells, 150 hectares by river lift irrigation and 1,800 hectares by other methods.

In 2013-14, Chandrakona II CD block produced 3,001 tonnes of Aman paddy, the main winter crop, from 2,462 hectares, 5,663 tonnes of Boro paddy (spring crop) from 1,794 hectares, 19 tonnes of wheat from 9 hectares and 145,235 tonnes of potatoes from 7,805 hectares. It also produced pulses and oilseeds.

=== Banking ===
In 2013-14, Chandrakona II CD block had offices of 6 commercial banks and 1 gramin bank.

== Transport ==
Chandrakona II CD block has 13 ferry services and 7 originating/ terminating bus routes.

The Kharagpur-Adra line of South Eastern Railway passes through this CD block and there is a station at Chandrakona Road.

== Communication ==
=== Website ===
Chandrakona II development block launched its Official website http://www.chandrakona2.in/, in association with Chandrakona II Panchayet Samity on 5 July 2012 at Chandrakona Town Hall. Namita Dey, Saha-sabhadhipati, Paschim Medinipur Zilla Parishad, inaugurated the website. Anshuman Adhikary, SDO Ghatal, Mamata Chowdhury, Sabhapati, Chandrakona II Panchayet Samity, Saikat Hazra, BDO - Chandrakona II Dev. Block, Ashek Rahman, BDO Chandrakona I Dev. Block, Debabrata Roy, BDO Ghatal, graced this occasion. A felicitation ceremony with the toppers of each school/ madrasha, under Chandrakona II Dev. Block and Chandrakona municipal area, in madhyamik exam'12, higher secondary exam'12 and high madrasah exam'12, was organized simultaneously on that stage as a part of the website launching programme.

== Education ==
In 2013-14, Chandrakona II CD block had 110 primary schools with 8,017 students, 9 middle schools with 533 students, 9 high schools with 3,861 students and 9 higher secondary schools with 9,799 students. Chandrakona II CD block had 1 technical/ professional institution with 105 students and 215 institutions for special and non-formal education with 9,272 students. Chandrakona municipal town had 1 general college (outside the CD block).

The United Nations Development Programme considers the combined primary and secondary enrolment ratio as the simple indicator of educational achievement of the children in the school going age. The infrastructure available is important. In Chandrakona II CD block out of the total 110 primary schools in 2008-2009, 38 had pucca buildings, 21 partially pucca, 1 kucha and 50 multiple type.

Chandrakona Vidyasagar Mahavidyalaya is the general degree college in this block.

== Culture ==
The Chandrakona II CD block has two heritage temples.

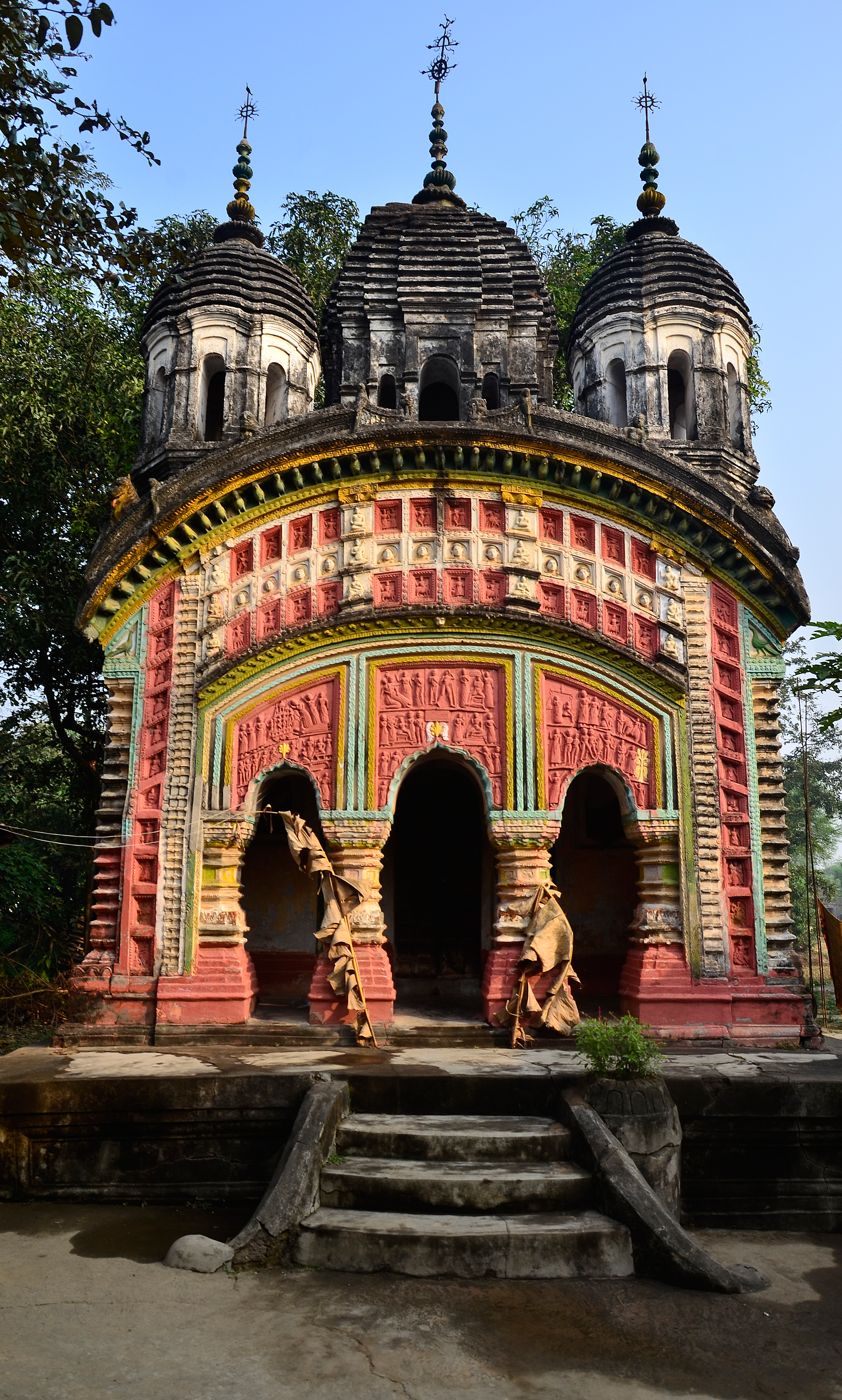
Jayantipur: Pancha ratna Shyamachandrajiu temple with rich terracotta façade, built in 1845. It also has a 17th century laterite built char chala.

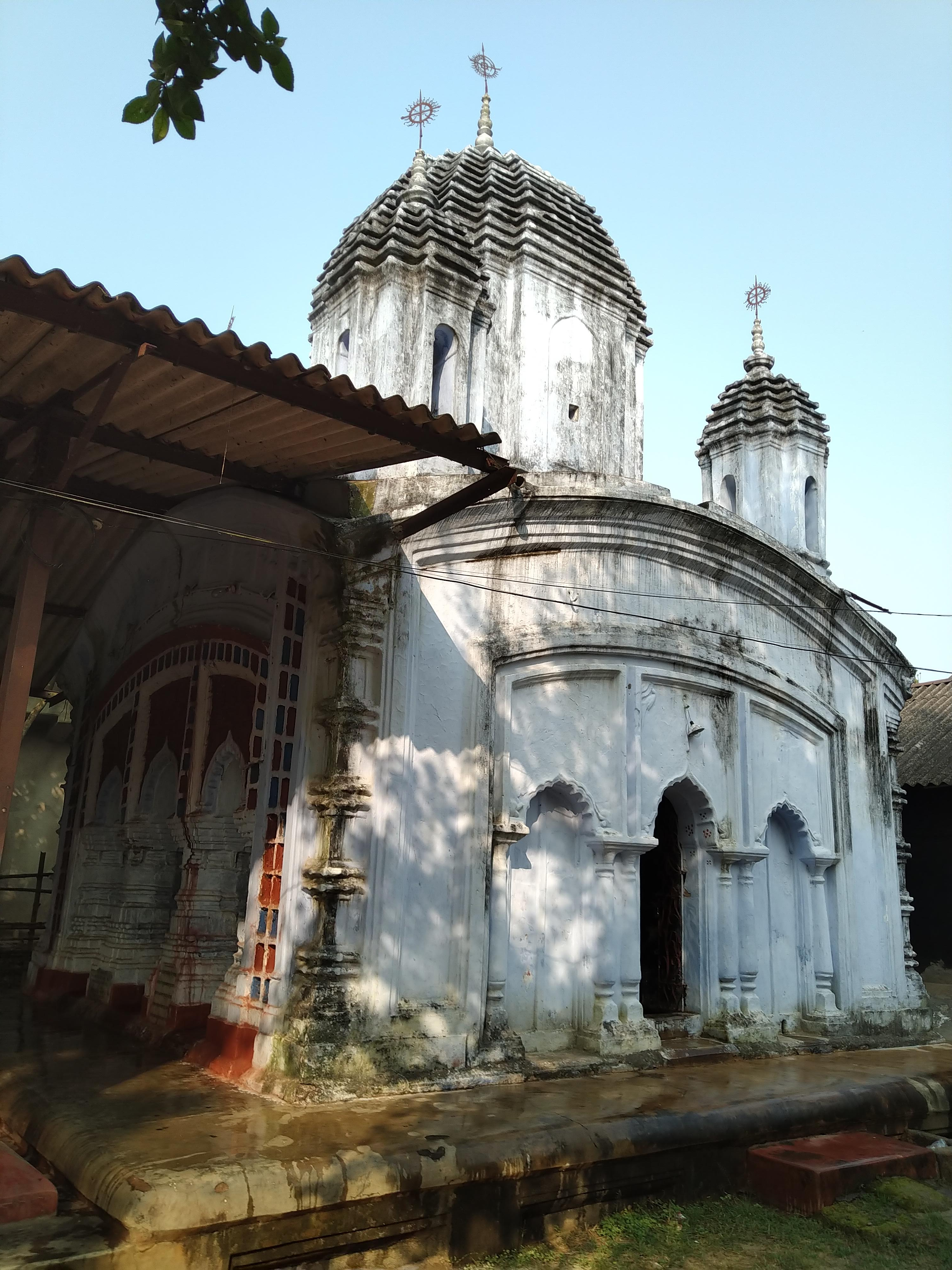
Baikunthapur: Pancha ratna Gopi Mohan temple, with rich terracotta façade, built in the 18th century

== Healthcare ==
In 2014, Chandrakona II CD block had 1 rural hospital, 2 primary health centres and 1 private nursing home with total 74 beds and 13 doctors. It had 23 family welfare sub centres and 1 family welfare centre. 10,773 patients were treated indoor and 143,838 patients were treated outdoor in the hospitals, health centres and subcentres of the CD block.

Chandrakona Rural Hospital, with 60 beds at Chandrakona, is the major government Chandrakona II CD block. There are primary health centres at: Basanchora (PO Chhatraganj) (with 10 beds) and Bhagabantapur (with 4 beds).
