= Anandapur, Paschim Medinipur =

Anandapur
- Village
- Location in West Bengal, India Anandapur (India)
- Coordinates: 22°33′47.2″N 87°24′33.1″E
- Country: India
- State: West Bengal
- District: Paschim Medinipur

Population (2011)
  - Total: 11,461

Languages
  - Official: Bengali, English
- Time zone: UTC+5:30 (IST)
- PIN: 721122 (Anandapur)
- Telephone/STD code: 03225
- Lok Sabha constituency: Ghatal
- Vidhan Sabha constituency: Keshpur
- Website: paschimmedinipur.gov.in

Anandapur is a village in the Keshpur CD block in the Medinipur Sadar subdivision of the Paschim Medinipur district in the state of West Bengal, India.

== Geography ==
Cities and towns in Medinpur Sadar subdivision of Paschim Medinipur district
M: municipal city/ town, CT: census town, R: rural/ urban centre, H: historical/ religious centre, F: facilities
Owing to space constraints in the small map, the actual locations in a larger map may vary slightly

=== Location ===
Anandapur is located at 22°33′47.2″N 87°24′33.1″E

=== Area overview ===
Paschim Medinipur district (before separation of Jhargram) had a total forest area of 1,700 km^{2}, accounting for 14.31% of the total forested area of the state. As observed from the map of the Midnapore Sadar subdivision, placed alongside, there are large stretches of forests in the subdivision. The soil is predominantly lateritic. Around 30% of the population of the district resides in this subdivision. 13.95% of the population lives in urban areas and 86.05% lives in the rural areas. Anandapur houses many schools like Anandapur High School.

Note: The map alongside presents some of the notable locations in the subdivision. All places marked in the map are linked in the larger full screen map.

== Demographics ==
According to the 2011 Census of India Anandapur had a total population of 11,461 of which 5,741 (50%) were males and 5,720 (50%) were females. Population in the age range 0–6 years was 1,337. The total number of literate persons in Anandapur was 7,826 (68.28% of the population over 6 years).

== Civic administration ==
=== Police station ===
Anandapur police station has jurisdiction over part of Keshpur CD block.
