= Srikanta Mahata =

Indian politician

Member of the West Bengal Legislative Assembly
- Incumbent
- Assumed office 2 May 2021
- Preceded by: Khagendranath Mahata
- Constituency: Salboni

Personal details
- Party: AITC
- Profession: Politician

Srikanta Mahata is an Indian politician member of All India Trinamool Congress. He is an MP, elected from the Salboni constituency in the 2011 West Bengal Legislative Assembly election. In 2016 and 2021 assembly election he was re-elected from the same constituency.

He belongs to a small village Kayma, post office- Bhimpur, p.s- Salboni, dist- paschim Medinipur.

He got married in the year 2015 to Anajana Mahata.
