= Pathra =

- Town and union council
- Country: Pakistan
- Region: Balochistan
- District: Lasbela District
- Time zone: UTC+5 (PST)

Godda is a town n.
