= Salboni Assembly constituency =

Salboni
- Constituency No. 234 for the West Bengal Legislative Assembly
- Interactive Map Outlining Salboni Assembly Constituency

Constituency details
- Country: India
- Region: East India
- State: West Bengal
- District: Paschim Medinipur
- Lok Sabha constituency: Jhargram
- Established: 1951
- Total electors: 208,442
- Reservation: None

Member of Legislative Assembly
- 18th West Bengal Legislative Assembly
- Incumbent Biman Mahata
- Party: BJP
- Alliance: NDA
- Elected year: 2026
- Preceded by: Srikanta Mahata

Salboni Assembly constituency is an assembly constituency in Paschim Medinipur district in the Indian state of West Bengal.

== Overview ==
As per orders of the Delimitation Commission, No. 234 Salboni Assembly constituency is composed of the following: Bhimpur, Bishnupur, Debgram, Lalgeria and Shalboni gram panchayats of Salboni community development block, Goaltor, Gohaldanga, Jeerapara, Makli, Patharpara and Pingbani gram panchayats of Garhbeta II community development block, and Garhbeta III community development block.

Salboni Assembly constituency is part of No. 33 Jhargram (Lok Sabha constituency) (ST).

== Members of the Legislative Assembly ==
Year	Name	Party
1952	Bejoy Gopal Goswami	Independent politician
1957	No Seat Exist	
1962	Niranjan Khamrai	Indian National Congress
1967	Amulya Ratan Mahanta	Bangla Congress
1969	Amulya Ratan Mahanta	Bangla Congress
1971	Sundar Hazra	Communist Party of India
1972	Thakurdas Mahata	Communist Party of India
1977	Sundar Hazra	Communist Party of India
1982	Sundar Hazra	Communist Party of India
1987	Sundar Hazra	Communist Party of India
1991	Sundar Hazra	Communist Party of India
1996	Khagendranath Mahanta	Communist Party of India
2001	Khagendranath Mahanta	Communist Party of India
2006	Khagendranath Mahanta	Communist Party of India
2011	Srikanta Mahata	All India Trinamool Congress
2016	Srikanta Mahata	All India Trinamool Congress
2021	Srikanta Mahata	All India Trinamool Congress
2026	Biman Mahata	Bharatiya Janata Party

== Election results ==
=== 2026 ===
2026 West Bengal Legislative Assembly election: Salboni
Party	Candidate	Votes	%	±%
BJP	Biman Mahata	132,856	49.86	▲12.39
AITC	Srikanta Mahata	117,613	44.14	▼6.43
ISF	Pijush Hansda	8,635	3.24	
INC	Srikanta Mahata	2,697	1.01	
NOTA	None of the above	1,921	0.72	▼0.07
Majority		15,243	5.72	▼7.38
Turnout		266,475	95.3	▲5.32
BJP hold		Swing		

=== 2021 ===
In the 2021 election, Srikanta Mahata of Trinamool Congress defeated his nearest rival, Rajib Kundu of BJP.

2021 West Bengal Legislative Assembly election: Salboni
Party	Candidate	Votes	%	±%
AITC	Srikanta Mahata	126,020	50.57	
BJP	Rajib Kundu	93,376	37.47	+26.75
CPI(M)	Sushanta Ghosh	19,859	7.97	−22.27
Independent	Rasbihari Mahata	2,643	1.06	
NOTA	None of the above	1,965	0.79	
Majority		32,644	13.1	
Turnout		249,195	89.98	
AITC hold		Swing		

=== 2016 ===
In the 2016 election, Srikanta Mahata of Trinamool Congress defeated his nearest rival, Shyam Sundar Pandey of CPI(M).

West Bengal assembly elections, 2016: Salboni
Party	Candidate	Votes	%	±%
AITC	Srikanta Mahata	120,485	53.91	+6.37
CPI(M)	Shyam Sundar Pandey	67,583	30.24	−15.05
BJP	Dhiman Kumar Kolay	23,965	10.72	+7.91
SS	Goutam Kouri	4,402	1.97	
NOTA	None of the above	2,551	1.14	
AJSU	Animesh Mahata	1,810	0.81	
Independent	Satish Singh	1,454	0.65	
SUCI(C)	Kalipada Mahato	1,232	0.55	
Turnout		223,483	90.35	−2.57
AITC hold		Swing		

=== 2011 ===
In the 2011 election, Srikanta Mahata of Trinamool Congress defeated his nearest rival Abhiram mahato of CPI(M).

West Bengal assembly elections, 2011: Salboni
Party	Candidate	Votes	%	±%
AITC	Srikanta Mahata	92,082	47.54	+10.26
CPI(M)	Abhiram Mahato	87,727	45.29	−9.42
BJP	Dhiman Kumar Kolay	5,439	2.81	
Independent	Tarun Manna	3,473		
JMM	Darku Murmu	3,272		
JDP	Sunil Tudu	1,692		
Turnout		193,685	92.92	
AITC gain from CPI(M)		Swing	19.68	

=== 2006 ===
In the 2006, 2001 and 1996 state assembly elections, Khagendranath Mahata of CPI(M) won the Salboni assembly seat defeating his nearest rivals, Uttara Singha (Hazra) of Trinamool Congress in 2006, Dinen Roy of Trinamool Congress in 2001, and Tapas Das of Jharkhand Party (Naren) in 1996. Contests in most years were multi cornered but only winners and runners are being mentioned. Sundar Hazra of CPI(M) defeated Bijoy Mahata of Janata Party in 1991, Basanti Mahata of Congress in 1987, Kali Sadhan Mahata of Congress in 1982, and Basanti Mahata of Congress in 1977.

=== 1972 ===
Thakurdas Mahata of CPI won in 1972. Sundar Hazra of CPI(M) won in 1971. Amulya Ratan Mahata of Bangla Congress won in 1969 and 1967. Niranjan Khamrai of Congress won in 1962. The Salboni seat did not exist in 1957. In independent India's first election in 1951, Bejoy Gopal Goswami, Independent, won the Salboni seat.
