= Gangaram Chak =

- Village
- Location in West Bengal, India Gangaram Chak (India)
- Coordinates: 22°22′44.4″N 87°33′43.2″E
- Country: India
- State: West Bengal
- District: Paschim Medinipur

Population (2011)
  - Total: 304

Languages*
  - Official: Bengali, Santali, English
- Time zone: UTC+5:30 (IST)
- Lok Sabha constituency: Ghatal
- Vidhan Sabha constituency: Debra
- Website: paschimmedinipur.gov.in

Gangaram Chak is a village, in the Debra CD block in the Kharagpur subdivision of the Paschim Medinipur district in the state of West Bengal, India.

== Geography ==
Cities and towns in the northern part of Kharagpur subdivision (including Khararagpur I & II, Debra and Pingla CD blocks) of Paschim Medinipur district
M: municipal city/ town, CT: census town, R: rural/ urban centre, H: historical/ religious centre, F: facilities
Owing to space constraints in the small map, the actual locations in a larger map may vary slightly

=== Location ===
Gangaram Chak is located at 22°22′44.4″N 87°33′43.2″E.

=== Area overview ===
Kharagpur subdivision, shown partly in the map alongside, mostly has alluvial soils, except in two CD blocks in the west – Kharagpur I and Keshiary, which mostly have lateritic soils. Around 74% of the total cultivated area is cropped more than once. With a density of population of 787 per km^{2}nearly half of the district’s population resides in this subdivision. 14.33% of the population lives in urban areas and 86.67% lives in the rural areas.

Note: The map alongside presents some of the notable locations in the subdivision. All places marked in the map are linked in the larger full screen map.

== Demographics ==
As per 2011 Census of India Gangaram Chak had a total population of 304 of which 147 (48%) were males and 157 (52%) were females. Population below 6 years was 28. The total number of literates in Gangaram Chak was 219 (72.04% of the population over 6 years).

.* For language details see Debra (community development block)#Language and religion

== Transport ==
Gangaram Chak is on the Debra-Tabagaria Road. This road connects it to the Dankuni-Chennai NH 16 near Haipat on one side and Balichak railway station on the Howrah-Kharagpur line of South Eastern Railway on the other side.

== Education ==
Debra Thana Sahid Kshudiram Smriti Mahavidyalaya, established in 2006, is affiliated to the Vidyasagar University. It offers honours courses in Bengali, Santali, English, Sanskrit, history, philosophy, geography, education, mathematics and physics. It also offers a course in BCA.
