= Sheikh Jahangir Karim =

West Bengal politician

Member of West Bengal Legislative Assembly
- In office 1987–2011
- Preceded by: Syed Moazzam Hossain
- Succeeded by: Radhakanta Maiti
- Constituency: Debra

Personal details
- Born: 9 May 1952 (age 74) Mainan, Midnapore district, West Bengal
- Party: Communist Party of India (Marxist)
- Education: Panskura Banamali College

Sheikh Jahangir Karim (born 9 May 1952) is an Indian politician and teacher. He served as a member of the West Bengal Legislative Assembly for over twenty years.

== Early life and family ==
Karim was born on 9 May 1952 to a Bengali family of Muslim Sheikhs in the village of Mainan in Midnapore district, West Bengal. He is the son of Sheikh Faqir Mohammad. He was educated at the Lowada High School in the nearby locality of Loyada and the Panskura Banamali College.

== Career ==
Karim was a teacher. He contested in the 1987 West Bengal Legislative Assembly election where he ran as a Communist Party of India (Marxist) candidate for Debra Assembly constituency, defeating Congress politician Sheikh Mohammed Daud. Karim contested in the 1991 West Bengal Legislative Assembly election and was re-elected to Debra, defeating Daud once again. He contested in the 1996 West Bengal Legislative Assembly election and was re-elected to Debra, defeating Congress politician Rabindranath Bera. Karim contested in the 2001 West Bengal Legislative Assembly election and was re-elected to Debra, defeating Trinamool politician Radhakanta Maiti. He contested in the 2006 West Bengal Legislative Assembly election and was re-elected to Debra, defeating Trinamool politician Mrigendra Nath Maiti. He lost to Trinamool candidate Selima Khatun in the 2016 West Bengal Legislative Assembly election.
