= Balichak railway station =

Railway station in West Bengal, India

Balichak
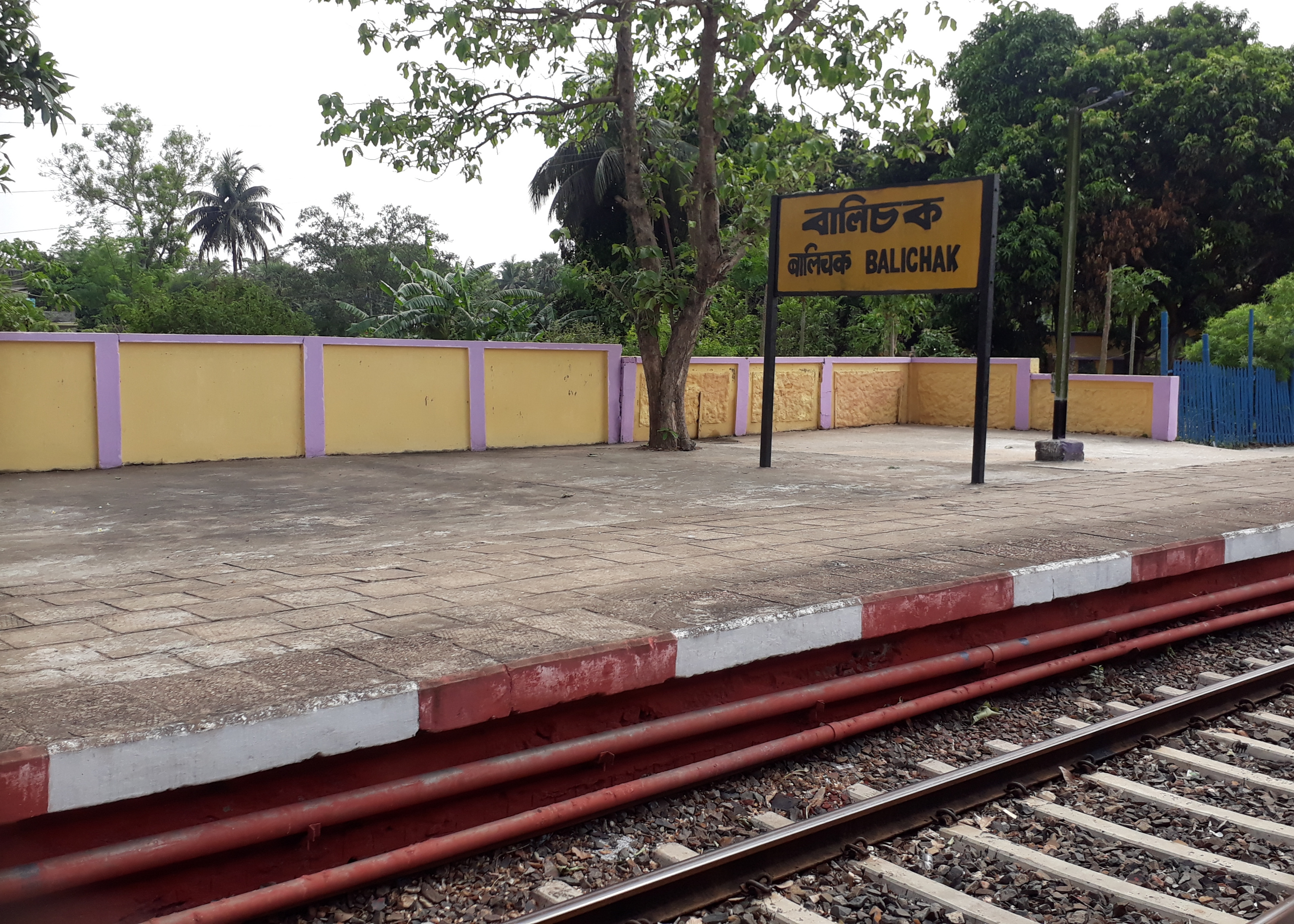
- Balichak railway station

General information
- Location: Balichak, Debra, Paschim Medinipur, West Bengal; India
- Coordinates: 22°21′28″N 87°33′10″E
- Elevation: 20 metres (66 ft)
- System: Kolkata Suburban Railway
- Owner: Indian Railways
- Line: Howrah–Kharagpur line
- Platforms: 5

Construction
- Structure type: Standard on-ground station
- Parking: No
- Cycle facilities: yes

Other information
- Station code: BCK
- Fare zone: South Eastern Railway

History
- Opened: 1900
- Electrified: 1967–69

Services
Preceding station	Kolkata Suburban Railway	Following station
Shyam Chak towards Midnapore	South Eastern Line Howrah–Kharagpur line	Duan towards Howrah Junction
Route map
Location
- Location within West Bengal

The Balichak railway station in the Indian state of West Bengal, serves Balichak, India in Paschim Medinipur district. It is under the jurisdiction of South Eastern Railway zone. Balichak railway station is a medium railway station of Kharagpur railway division. It is on the Howrah–Kharagpur line. It is 90 km (56 mi) from Howrah station.

== History ==
Balichak railway station is situated in Balichak, Debra, West Bengal. Station code is BCK. It is a small railway station between Howrah and Kharagpur. Adjacent stations are Shyam Chak and Duan and the major nearby railway station is Kharagpur Junction. Local EMU trains Howrah–Balichak, Howrah–Kharagpur, Santragachi–Kharagpur local, Howrah–Kharagpur local, Howrah–Midnapore Local train stop here. The Howrah–Kharagpur line was opened in 1900. The Howrah–Kharagpur stretch has three lines. There is a plan to build a fourth line for the Santragachi–Panskura–Kharagpur stretch. The Howrah–Kharagpur line was electrified in 1967–69.
