= Duan =

Duan may refer to:

- Duan (surname), a Chinese surname
  - Duan dynasty, the ruling dynasty of the Dali Kingdom
- Duan tribe, pre-state tribe during the era of Sixteen Kingdoms in China
- Duan language, spoken on the Laotian–Vietnamese border
- Duan, mark of level in Chinese martial arts
- Duan (title), alternative spelling of Dewan
- Lê Duẩn, the General Secretary of the Communist Party of Vietnam from 1959 until his death in 1986, and leader of Vietnam from 1969 to 1986
- Du'an Yao Autonomous County, in Guangxi, China
- Zaiyi, Prince Duan (1856-1922), Manchu prince and statesman during the late Qing dynasty
- Duan railway station, Paschim Medinipur district, West Bengal
