= Subhashis Om =

Indian politician (born 1985)

Member of the West Bengal Legislative Assembly
- Incumbent
- Assumed office 4 May 2026
- Preceded by: Humayun Kabir
- Constituency: Debra

Personal details
- Born: 1985 (age 40–41)
- Party: Bharatiya Janata Party
- Education: M.Sc; B.Ed
- Alma mater: Vidyasagar University
- Occupation: Teacher
- Profession: Politician

Subhasis Om (born 1985) is an Indian politician from West Bengal. He is a member of the West Bengal Legislative Assembly from the Debra Assembly constituency in Paschim Medinipur district representing the Bharatiya Janata Party.

== Early life and education ==
Om is from Debra, Paschim Medinipur district, West Bengal. He is the son of Debashis Om. He completed his BSc in 2007 and his MSc. in 2009 at Vidyasagar University. Later he did B. Ed in 2014. He is employed in government service as a teacher. He declared assets worth Rs.67 lakhs in his affidavit to the Election Commission of India.

== Career ==
Om won the Debra Assembly constituency representing the Bharatiya Janata Party in the 2026 West Bengal Legislative Assembly election. He polled 1,14,463 votes and defeated his nearest rival, Rajib Banerjee of the All India Trinamool Congress, by a margin of 28,801 votes.
