= Radhakanta Maiti =

Member of the West Bengal Legislative Assembly
- In office 2011–2016
- Preceded by: Sheikh Jahangir Karim
- Succeeded by: Selima Khatun
- Constituency: Debra

Personal details
- Party: All India Trinamool Congress

Radhakanta Maiti is an Indian politician associated with the All India Trinamool Congress. He served as a Member of the West Bengal Legislative Assembly representing the Debra constituency from 2011 to 2016.
