= Balichak =

- Census Town
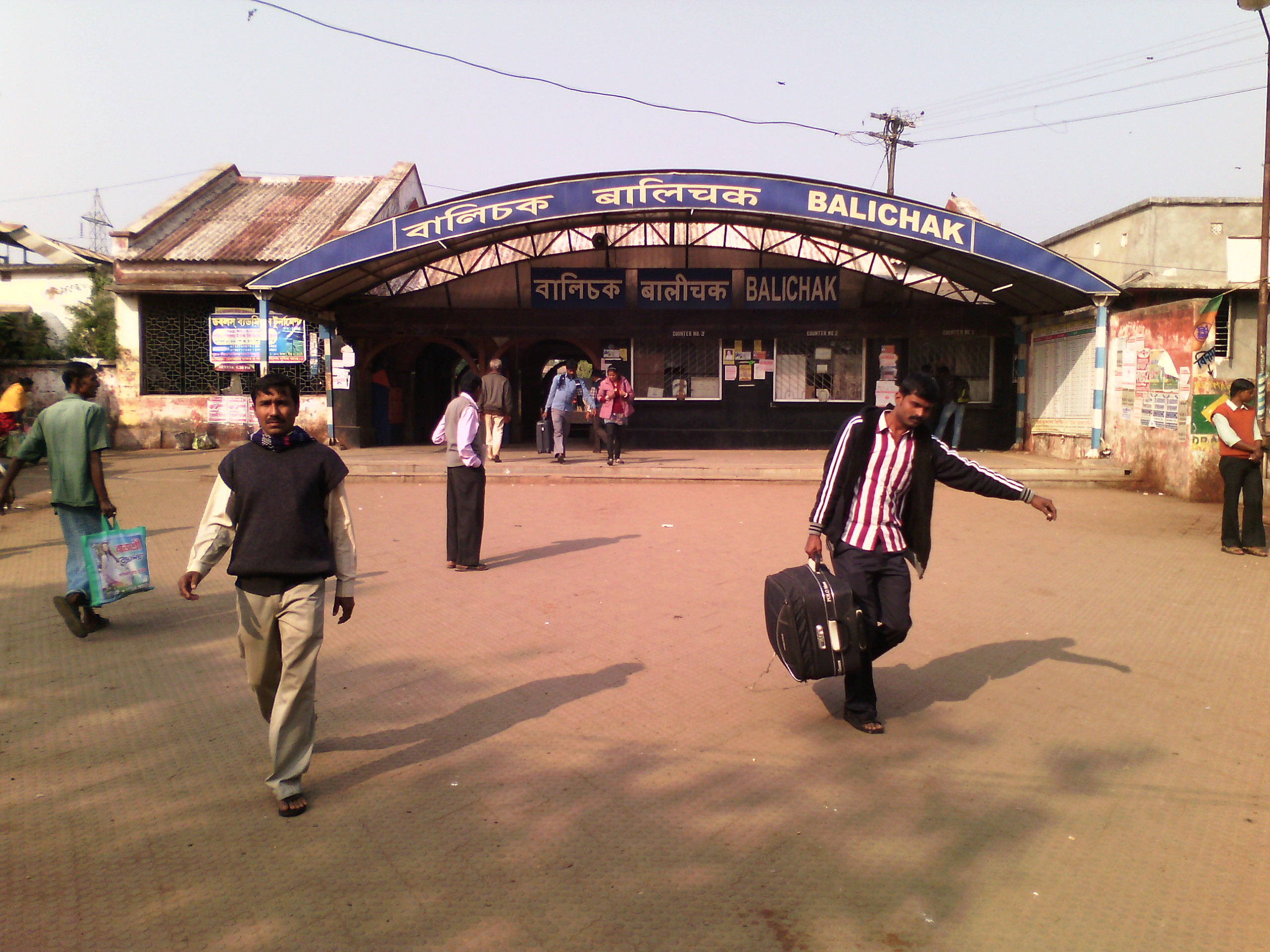
- Balichak railway station

- Location in West Bengal, India Balichak (India)
- Coordinates: 22.37°N 87.55°E
- Country: India
- State: West Bengal
- District: Paschim Medinipur

Area
  - Total: 4.66 km^{2} (1.80 sq mi)
- Elevation: 12 m (39 ft)

Population (2011)
  - Total: 13,784
  - Density: 2,960/km^{2} (7,660/sq mi)

Languages*
  - Official: Bengali, Santali, English
- Time zone: UTC+5:30 (IST)
- PIN: 721124
- Telephone code: 03222
- Vehicle registration: WB34, WB36
- Lok Sabha constituency: Ghatal
- Vidhan Sabha constituency: Debra
- Website: paschimmedinipur.gov.in

Balichak is a census town in the Debra CD block in the Kharagpur subdivision of the Paschim Medinipur district in the state of West Bengal, India.

== Geography ==
Cities and towns in the northern part of Kharagpur subdivision (including Khararagpur I & II, Debra and Pingla CD blocks) of Paschim Medinipur district
M: municipal city/ town, CT: census town, R: rural/ urban centre, H: historical/ religious centre, F: facilities
Owing to space constraints in the small map, the actual locations in a larger map may vary slightly

=== Location ===
Balichak is located at 22.37°N 87.55°E. It has an average elevation of 12 metres (42 feet). It is located in the Debra CD Block in the Kharagpur subdivision of the Paschim Medinipur district.

=== Area overview ===
Kharagpur subdivision, shown partly in the map alongside, mostly has alluvial soils, except in two CD blocks in the west – Kharagpur I and Keshiary, which mostly have lateritic soils. Around 74% of the total cultivated area is cropped more than once. With a density of population of 787 per km^{2}nearly half of the district’s population resides in this subdivision. 14.33% of the population lives in urban areas and the rest in the rural areas.

Note: The map alongside presents some of the notable locations in the subdivision. All places marked in the map are linked in the larger full screen map.

== Demographics ==
According to the 2011 Census of India, Balichak had a population of 13,784, of which 14,977(49%) were males and 15,834(51%) females. There were 3,261 persons in the age range of 0–6 years. The total number of literate persons in Balichak was 27,550(89.41% of the population over 6 years).

.*For language details see Debra (community development block)#Language and religion

== Civic administration ==
=== CD block HQ ===
The headquarters of Debra CD block are located at Balichak.

== Infrastructure ==
According to the District Census Handbook 2011, Paschim Medinipur, Balichak covered an area of 4.66 km^{2}. Among the civic amenities, it had 3 km roads with open drains, the protected water supply involved tap water from untreated sources, borewell, tubewell. It had 2,500 domestic electric connections, 200 road lighting points. Among the medical facilities, it had 1 hospital, 1 dispensary/ health centre, 3 medicine shops. Among the educational facilities it had were 10 primary schools, 4 middle schools, 4 secondary schools, 2 senior secondary schools, the nearest general degree college at Debra, 3 km away. It had 4 recognised shorthand, typewriting and vocational training institutes. Among the social, recreational and cultural facilities, it had 1 cinema theatre, 2 public libraries, 3 reading rooms. Rice and wheat were two important commodities it produced. It had branch offices of 2 nationalised banks, 2 cooperative banks, 2 agricultural credit societies, 7 non-agricultural societies.

== Economy ==
There are few Banks and financial houses that serve the people living in Balichak and nearby areas. While State Bank of India is the busiest of all, other banks like Punjab National Bank, Vidyasagar Central Co-operative Bank Ltd also have their presence here. Bandhan Bank has a banking and a DSC branch at Balichak. Punjab National Bank has two branches here. SBI Branch is at station Road, PNB (Balichak Branch) near Balichak Bhajahari institution and PNB (Hamirpur Branch) is at Balichak station road, Vidyasagar Central Coop Bank is at Balichak daily bazar. AU Small Finance Bank has opened a branch. State Bank of India also has e-corner with branch. Life Insurance Corporation has a satellite branch in Balichak. The Private institutions do business mainly in the investment area.

== Transportation ==
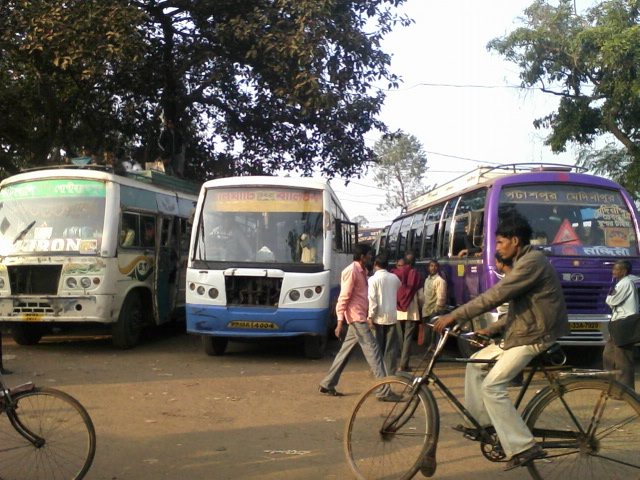
Balichak Bus stand, Balichak

Balichak is well connected by roads/highways to other important towns of South Bengal. Locals use bicycles and motorbikes for transportation within the town. Rickshaws and cabs, autoes are also available.

Balichak railway station is on the Howrah-Kharagpur line. It is 90.5 km from Howrah station.

== Education ==
There are a number of schools in Balichak:

- Maa Sarada Vidyamandir
- Balichak Christopherday School
- Ramakrishna nursery school
- Aurobinda Vidyabhawan (English Medium, ICSE Board)
- Balichak Bhajahari Institution
- Balichak Girls High School
- Antala Sitala High School
- Duan Rudreswar High School
- Jhanjia Gopal Chandra Institution
- Brahmansasan Kamala Vidyapith

== Culture ==
The regular Bengali festivals like Durga Puja, Saraswati Puja and Kali Puja are well attended. Other common pujas in the worship of Shitala, Jagaddhatri, Holi, Janmastami, Rath Yatra, Dussera (Ravan Pora) also take place.
