= Biplab Roy Chowdhury =

Indian politician

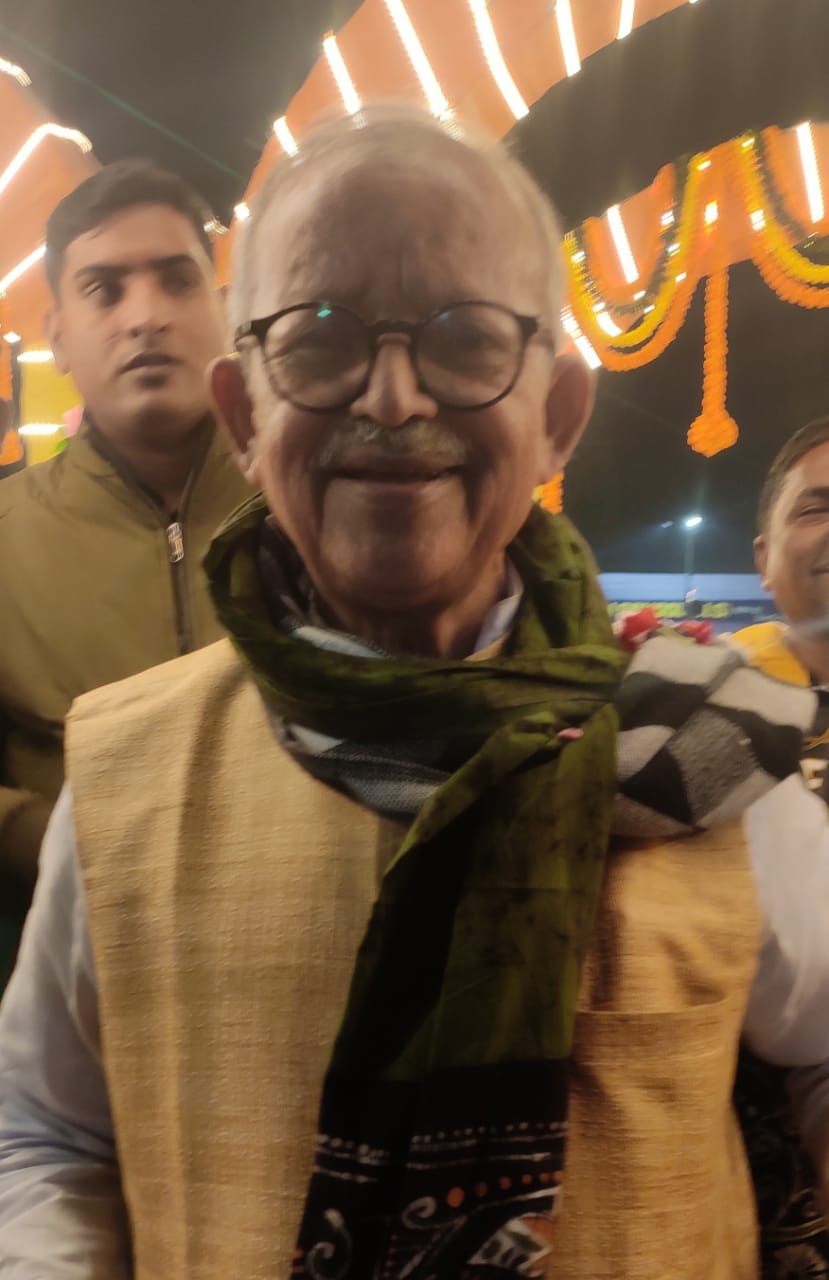
- Biplab Roy Chowdhury

Cabinet Minister of Government of West Bengal
- Incumbent
- Assumed office 3 August 2022
- Chief Minister: Mamata Banerjee
- Department: Fisheries
- Preceded by: Akhil Giri

Member of the West Bengal Legislative Assembly
- Incumbent
- Assumed office 1996–2006, 2011–2016; 2 May 2021
- Constituency: Panskura Purba
- Preceded by: Sheikh Ibrahim Ali

Personal details
- Born: 7 September 1946 (age 79)
- Party: Trinamool Congress (1998–present); Indian National Congress (1971–1998)

Biplab Roy Chowdhury is an Indian politician and the former Minister for Department of Fisheries in the Government of West Bengal. He was also a Member of the Legislative Assembly (India), elected from the Panskura Purba constituency in the 1996, 2001, 2011 and 2021 West Bengal assembly elections.
