= Radhamohanpur =

- Village
- Location within West Bengal Location within India
- Coordinates: 22.3609517°N 87.6112325°E
- Country: India
- State: West Bengal
- District: Paschim Medinipur
- Elevation: 14 m (46 ft)

Languages*
  - Official: Bengali, Santali, English
- Time zone: UTC+5:30 (IST)
- Telephone code: 03222
- ISO 3166 code: IN-WB
- Lok Sabha constituency: Ghatal
- Vidhan Sabha constituency: Debra
- Website: paschimmedinipur.gov.in

Radhamohanpur is a village in Debra Community Development Block in West Medinipur District of West Bengal, India. It is located in the Burdwan Division, 28 km towards East from District headquarters Midnapore. Bengali is the Local Language. Radhamohanpur village is surrounded by Pingla Block towards South, Panskura-I Block towards East, Kharagpur-II Block towards west, Keshpur Block towards North. Radhamohanpur Railway Station lies along the Kharagpur- Howrah Railway line.

== Demographics census 2011 ==
The Radhamohanpur village has population of 189, of which 90 are male and 99 are female, as per Population Census 2011. Radhamohanpur village has population of children with age 0-6 of 15, which makes up 7.94% of total population of village. Average Sex Ratio of Radhamohanpur village is 1100 females per 1000 males, which is higher than West Bengal state average of 950. Child Sex Ratio for the Radhamohanpur as per census is 667, lower than West Bengal average of 956. Radhamohanpur village has lower literacy rate as compared to West Bengal. In 2011, literacy rate of Radhamohanpur village was 62.07% as compared to 76.26% of West Bengal. In Radhamohanpur Male literacy is 75.31% while female literacy rate is 50.54%.

.*For language details see Debra (community development block)#Language and religion
