= Debra (community development block) =

- Community development block
- Coordinates: 22.3906°N 87.5673°E
- Country: India
- State: West Bengal
- District: Paschim Medinipur

Government
  - Type: Federal democracy

Area
  - Total: 342.41 km^{2} (132.21 sq mi)
- Elevation: 12 m (39 ft)

Population (2011)
  - Total: 288,619
  - Density: 842.90/km^{2} (2,183.1/sq mi)

Languages
  - Official: Bengali, Santali, English
- Time zone: UTC+5:30 (IST)
- Telephone/STD code: 03222
- ISO 3166 code: IN-WB
- Literacy: 82.03%
- Lok Sabha constituency: Ghatal
- Vidhan Sabha constituency: Debra
- Website: paschimmedinipur.gov.in

Debra is a community development block that forms an administrative division in the Kharagpur subdivision of Paschim Medinipur district in the Indian state of West Bengal.

== History ==
=== Naxalite movement in Debra-Gopiballavpur ===
In 1968 many revolutionary intellectuals, broadly termed as Naxalites, settled in Gopiballavpur. Amongst them was Santosh Rana, who was a local person. In September 1969 a guerrilla squad killed an oppressive landlord. The landlords fled to the towns and a big peasant movement began. Landlords’ crops were forcibly harvested. Around 150 people were killed. Santosh Rana was the key figure in virtually “liberating” Debra, Gopiballavpur and neighbouring areas in West Bengal, as well as in Odisha and Jharkhand (which was part of Bihar at the time). The movement gradually split and collapsed in the early seventies.

== Geography ==
Debra CD block is largely a flood prone marshy wetland. In this block 100% of the cultivated area has highly productive alluvial soil.

Debra is located at 22°23′26″N 87°34′02″E.

Debra CD block is bounded by Daspur I CD block in the north, Panskura CD block, in Purba Medinipur district, in the east, Pingla CD block in the south and Kharagpur II and Keshpur CD blocks in the west.

It is located 28 km from Midnapore, the district headquarters.

Debra CD block has an area of 342.41 km^{2}. It has 1 panchayat samity, 14 gram panchayats, 214 gram sansads (village councils), 477 mouzas and 460 inhabited villages. Debra police station serves this block. Headquarters of this CD block is at Balichak.

Debra CD block had a forest cover of 540 hectares, against a total geographical area of 34,231 hectares in 2005-06.

Gram panchayats of Debra block/ panchayat samiti are: Bhabanipur, Bharatpur, Debra I, Debra II, Duan I, Duan II, Golgram, Jalimanda, Khanamohan, Malighati, Radhamohanpur I, Radhamohanpur II, Satyapur and Snarpur Lowada.

== Demographics ==
=== Population ===
According to the 2011 Census of India, Debra CD block had a total population of 288,619, of which 274,835 were rural and 13,784 were urban. There were 145,559 (50%) males and 143,060 (50%) females. Population in the age range 0–6 years was 31,859. Scheduled Castes numbered 37,503 (12.99%) and Scheduled Tribes numbered 59,122 (20.48%).

As per 2001 census, Debra block had a total population of 255,196, out of which 129,109 were males and 126,087 were females. Debra block registered a population growth of 15.80 per cent during the 1991-2001 decade. Decadal growth for the combined Midnapore district was 14.87 per cent. Decadal growth in West Bengal was 17.45 per cent.

Census Towns in Debra CD block are (2011 census figures in brackets): Balichak (13,784).

Large villages (with 4,000+ population) in Debra CD block are (2011 census figures in brackets): Baragar (4,329).

Other villages in Debra CD block include (2011 census figures in brackets): Debra (2,347), Bhawanipur (1,700), Bharatpur (826), Golgram (3,984), Malighati (2,379), Satyapur (3,091), Jalimanda (2,263), Duan (3,497), Radhamohanpur (3,604), Khana Mohan (559), Shanrpur (1,252), Loyada (1,520) and Chak Bajit (560).

=== Literacy ===
As per the 2011 census the total number of literates in Debra CD block was 210,618 (82.03% of the population over 6 years) out of which males numbered 114,992 (88.78% of the male population over 6 years) and females numbered 95,626 (75.16% of the female population over 6 years). The gender gap in literacy rates was 13.62%.

See also – List of West Bengal districts ranked by literacy rate

Literacy in CD blocks of
Paschim Medinipur district
Jhargram subdivision
Binpur I – 69.74%
Binpur II – 70.46%
Gopiballavpur I – 65.44%
Gopiballavpur II – 71.40%
Jamboni – 72.63%
Jhargram – 72.23%
Nayagram – 63.70%
Sankrail – 73.35%
Medinipur Sadar subdivision
Garhbeta I – 72.21%
Garhbeta II – 75.87%
Garhbeta III – 73.42%
Keshpur – 77.88%
Midnapore Sadar – 70.48%
Salboni – 74.87%
Ghatal subdivision
Chandrakona I – 78.93%
Chandrakona II – 75.96%
Daspur I – 83.99%
Daspur II – 85.62%
Ghatal – 81.08%
Kharagpur subdivision
Dantan I – 73.53%
Dantan II – 82.45%
Debra – 82.03%
Keshiari – 76.78%
Kharagpur I – 77.06%
Kharagpur II – 76.08%
Mohanpur – 80.51%
Narayangarh – 78.31%
Pingla – 83.57%
Sabang – 86.84%
2011 Census: CD Block Wise

Primary Census Abstract Data

=== Language and religion ===
Religion in Debra CD block (2011)
Hinduism	88.16%
Islam	10.34%
Other (tribal religion)	1.12%
Other or not stated	0.38%

In the 2011 census Hindus formed 88.16% and Muslims formed 10.34% of the population. Christians and other religious communities formed 1.50% of the population. Others including Addi Bassi, Marang Boro, Santal, Saranath, Sari Dharma, Sarna, Alchchi, Bidin, Sant, Saevdharm, Seran, Saran, Sarin, Kheria, Christian and other religious communities. In 2001, Hindus were 87.81%, Muslims 9.53% and tribal religions 2.31% of the population respectively.

Languages of Debra CD block (2011)
1. Bengali (86.8%)
2. Santali (9.06%)
3. Hindi (1.69%)
4. Others (2.48%)

At the time of the 2011 census, 86.77% of the population spoke Bengali, 9.06% Santali and 1.69% Hindi as their first language.

== BPL families ==
In Debra CD block 37.37% families were living below poverty line in 2007.

According to the District Human Development Report of Paschim Medinipur: The 29 CD blocks of the district were classified into four categories based on the poverty ratio. Nayagram, Binpur II and Jamboni CD blocks have very high poverty levels (above 60%). Kharagpur I, Kharagpur II, Sankrail, Garhbeta II, Pingla and Mohanpur CD blocks have high levels of poverty (50-60%), Jhargram, Midnapore Sadar, Dantan I, Gopiballavpur II, Binpur I, Dantan II, Keshiari, Chandrakona I, Gopiballavpur I, Chandrakona II, Narayangarh, Keshpur, Ghatal, Sabang, Garhbeta I, Salboni, Debra and Garhbeta III CD blocks have moderate levels of poverty (25-50%) and Daspur II and Daspur I CD blocks have low levels of poverty (below 25%).

== Economy ==
=== Infrastructure ===
458 or 96% of mouzas in Debra CD block were electrified by 31 March 2014.

473 mouzas in Debra CD block had drinking water facilities in 2013-14. There were 84 fertiliser depots, 36 seed stores and 37 fair price shops in the CD block.

=== Agriculture ===
Persons engaged in agriculture
in Debra CD block
1. Bargadars (6.76%)
2. Patta holders (19.7%)
3. Small farmers (3.63%)
4. Marginal farmers (23.3%)
5. Agricultural labourers (46.5%)

Although the Bargadari Act of 1950 recognised the rights of bargadars to a higher share of crops from the land that they tilled, it was not implemented fully. Large tracts, beyond the prescribed limit of land ceiling, remained with the rich landlords. From 1977 onwards major land reforms took place in West Bengal. Land in excess of land ceiling was acquired and distributed amongst the peasants. Following land reforms land ownership pattern has undergone transformation. In 2013-14, persons engaged in agriculture in Debra CD block could be classified as follows: bargadars 6.76%, patta (document) holders 19.74%, small farmers (possessing land between 1 and 2 hectares) 3.63%, marginal farmers (possessing land up to 1 hectare) 23.33% and agricultural labourers 46.53%.

In 2005-06 the nett cropped area in Debra CD block was 29,287 hectares and the area in which more than one crop was grown was 25,376 hectares.

The extension of irrigation has played a role in growth of the predominantly agricultural economy. In 2013-14, the total area irrigated in Debra CD block was 26,730 hectares, out of which 2,200 hectares were irrigated by tank water, 23,700 hectares by deep tubewells and 830 hectares by river lift irrigation.

In 2013-14, Debra CD block produced 4,635 tonnes of Aman paddy, the main winter crop, from 5,299 hectares, 224 tonnes of Aus paddy (summer crop) from 121 hectares, 65,627 tonnes of Boro paddy (spring crop) from 18,987 hectares, 27 tonnes of wheat from 12 hectares and 135,764 tonnes of potatoes from 5,235 hectares. It also produced pulses and oilseeds.

=== Banking ===
In 2013-14, Debra CD block had offices of 14 commercial banks and 2 gramin banks.

== Transport ==
Debra CD block has 5 ferry services and 13 originating/ terminating bus routes.

The Howrah-Kharagpur line passes through this CD block. Balichak is a station on this line.

The Dankuni-Kharagpur sector of National Highway 16 (old number NH 6) passes through this block.

== Education ==
In 2013-14, Debra CD block had 206 primary schools with 15,473 students, 13 middle schools with 941 students, 18 high schools with 7,963 students and 21 higher secondary schools with 19,923 students. Debra CD block had 1 general college with 1,688 students, 2 technical / professional institutions with 200 students and 585 institutions for special and non-formal education with 19,938 students.

The United Nations Development Programme considers the combined primary and secondary enrolment ratio as the simple indicator of educational achievement of the children in the school going age. The infrastructure available is important. In Debra CD block out of the total 206 primary schools in 2008-2009, 76 had pucca buildings, 54 partially pucca, 6 kucha and 70 multiple type.

Debra Thana Sahid Kshudiram Smriti Mahavidyalaya is a co-educational college established in 2006 at Gangaram Chak. Affiliated to Vidyasagar University, it offers honours courses in Bengali, English, Sanskrit, history, philosophy, geography, education, physics and mathematics.

== Culture ==
The Debra CD block has several heritage temples.

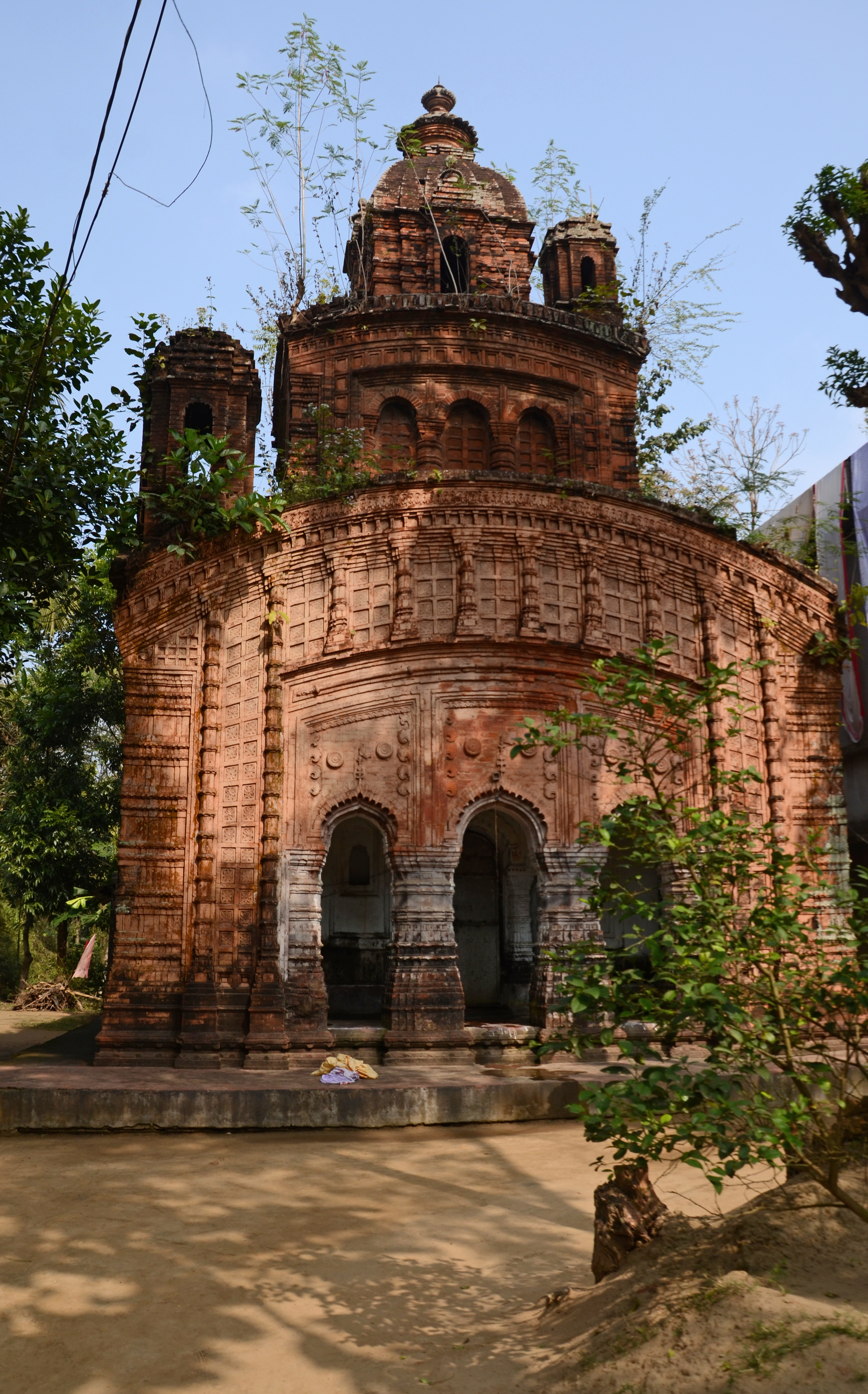
Satyapur: the Shiv Durga sikhar deul, the Satyeswar sikhar deul and nava ratna Sitalananda temple (in picture).

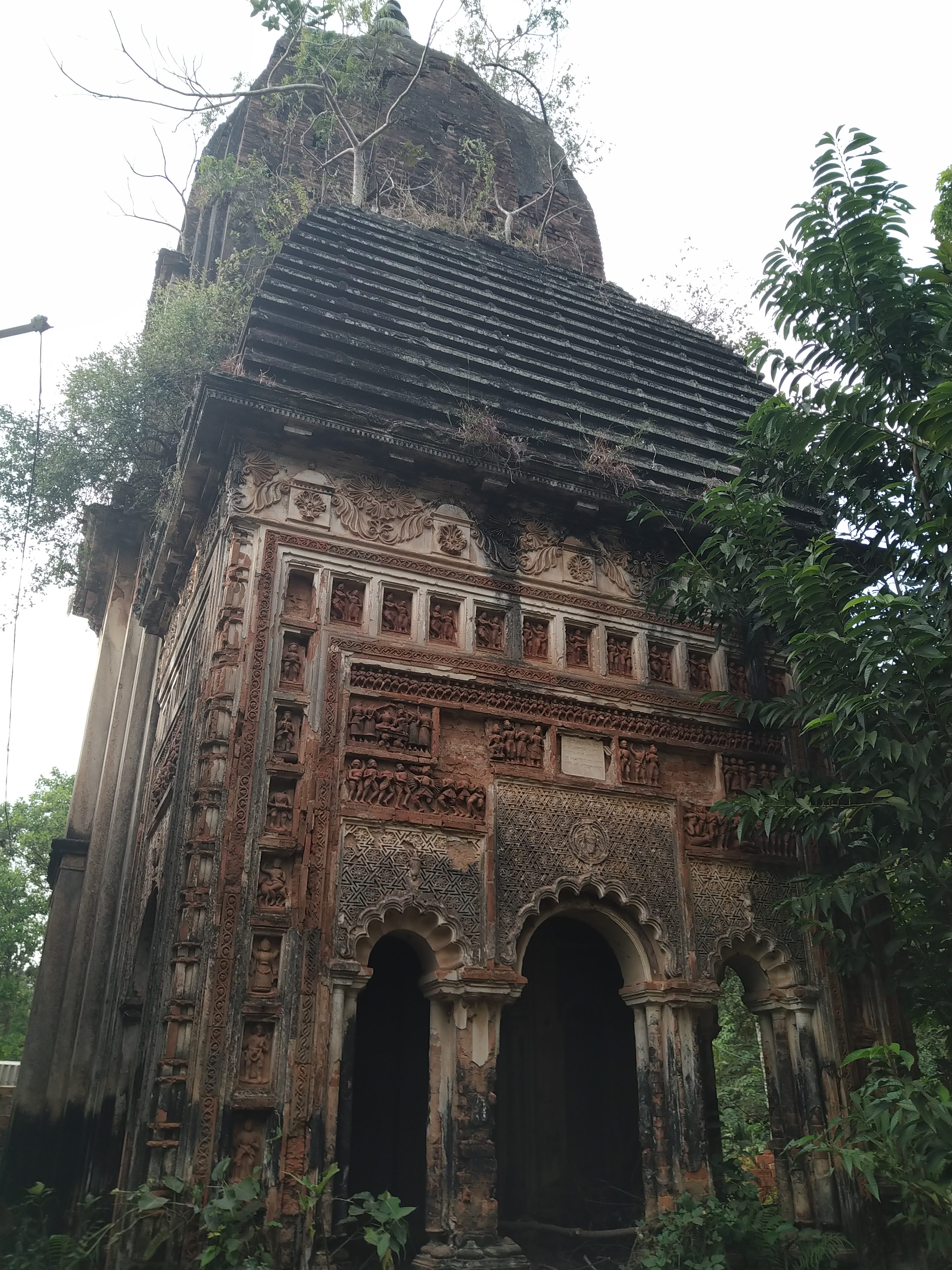
Loyada: Radhagobindajiu sikhar deul with porch in front, built in 1860.

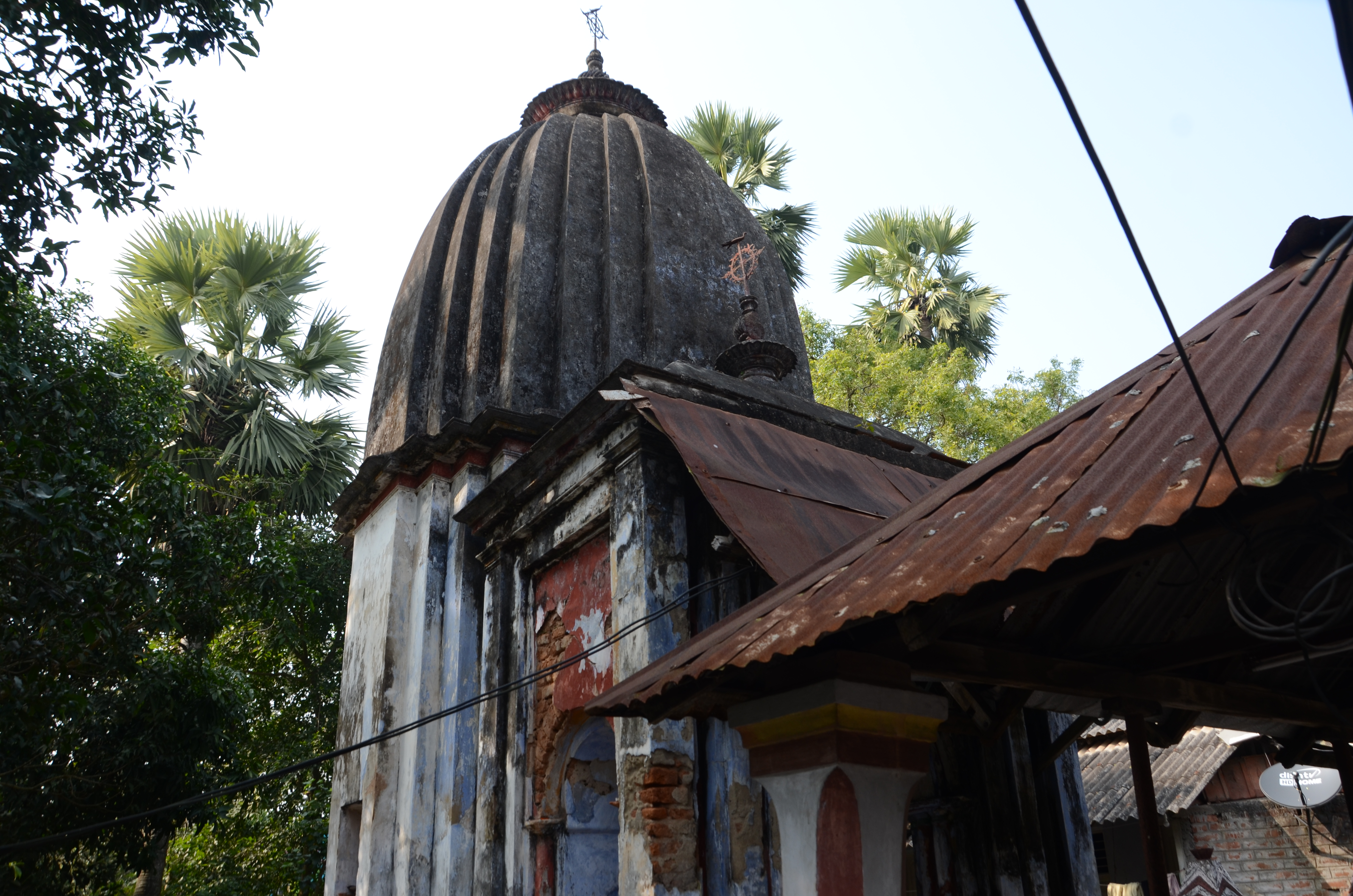
Chak Bajit: Sridharji and Gour Nitai rekha deul.

== Healthcare ==
In 2014, Debra CD block had one superspeciality hospital, 1 rural hospital, 5 primary health centres and 14 private nursing homes with total 232 beds and 14 doctors. It had 44 family welfare sub centres and 1 family welfare centre. 5,851 patients were treated indoor and 123,807 patients were treated outdoor in the hospitals, health centres and subcentres of the CD Block.

Debra Rural Hospital, with 40 beds at Debra Bazar, is the major government medical facility in the Debra CD block. There are primary health centres at: Satyapur (PO Marotala) (with 6 beds), Pasang (with 10 beds), Trilochanpur (PO Sijgeria) (with 6 beds) and Kankra Shibrampur (PO Kankra Ataram) (with 6 beds).

== Notable people ==
- Sheikh Jahangir Karim (born 1952), five-time MLA of Debra
