= Khirai railway station =

Railway station in West Bengal, India

Khirai

General information
- Location: Khirai, Purba Medinipur district, West Bengal; India
- Coordinates: 22°22′30″N 87°41′49″E
- Elevation: 12 metres (39 ft)
- System: Kolkata Suburban Railway station
- Owner: Indian Railways
- Line: Howrah–Kharagpur line
- Platforms: 3

Construction
- Structure type: Standard on-ground station
- Parking: No
- Cycle facilities: yes

Other information
- Station code: KHAI
- Fare zone: South Eastern Railway

History
- Opened: 1900
- Electrified: 1967–69

Services
Preceding station	Kolkata Suburban Railway	Following station
Haur towards Midnapore	South Eastern Line Howrah–Kharagpur line	Panskura towards Howrah Junction
Route map
Location
- Location within West Bengal

The Khirai railway station in the Indian state of West Bengal, serves Khirai in Purba Medinipur district. It is on the Howrah–Kharagpur line. It is 75 km (47 mi) from Howrah Station.

== History ==
Khirai railway station is situated in Meghadangar, West Bengal. Station code is KHAI. It is a small railway station between Howrah and Kharagpur. Local EMU trains Howrah–Balichak, Howrah–Kharagpur, Santragachi–Kharagpur local, Howrah–Kharagpur local stop here. The Howrah–Kharagpur line was opened in 1900. The Howrah–Kharagpur stretch has three lines. There is a plan to build a fourth line for the Santragachi–Panskura–Kharagpur stretch. The Howrah–Kharagpur line was electrified in 1967–69.
