= Subrata Maity =

Indian politician (born 1983)

Subrata Maity (Rana) (born 1983) is an Indian politician from West Bengal. He is a member of West Bengal Legislative Assembly from the Panskura Purba Assembly constituency in Purba Medinipur district representing the Bharatiya Janata Party.

== Early life ==
Maity is from Keshiary, Paschim Medinipur district, West Bengal. He is the son of Pratap Maity. He studied till Class 7 at Baghasti Union Haricharan High School, Keshiary block, Paschim Medinipur. After a break, he passed Class 12 at Kola Union High School in 2001. Later, he did his Diploma in Gems and Jewellery at Sindhar Institute of Gemology in 2003. He used to work as a daily labourer in 2016 and later started his own business. He declared assets worth Rs.11 crore in 2026, from Rs.15,000 in 2016, in his affidavits to the Election Commission of India.

== Career ==
Maity won the Panskura Purba Assembly constituency representing the Bharatiya Janata Party in the 2026 West Bengal Legislative Assembly election. He polled 1,09,264 votes and defeated his nearest rival, Ashim Kumar Maji of the All India Trinamool Congress, by a margin of 17,903 votes. In the 2016 West Bengal Legislative Assembly election, he finished fifth as an independent candidate from Mahisadal Assembly constituency, which is won by Sudarshan Ghosh Dastidar of the Trinamool Congress. Another independent candidate, Subrata Maiti, a doctor, finished second.
