= Syed Moazzam Hossain =

West Bengal politician

Member of West Bengal Legislative Assembly
- In office 1977–1987
- Preceded by: Rabindra Nath Bera
- Succeeded by: Sheikh Jahangir Karim
- Constituency: Debra Assembly constituency

Personal details
- Born: Midnapore district, West Bengal
- Party: Communist Party of India (Marxist)

Syed Moazzam Hossain is an Indian politician belonging to the Communist Party of India (Marxist). He was a member of the West Bengal Legislative Assembly.

== Early life and family ==
Hossain was born into a Bengali family of Muslim Syeds in Midnapore district, West Bengal.

== Career ==
Hossain was a teacher. He contested in the 1977 West Bengal Legislative Assembly election where he ran as a Communist Party of India (Marxist) candidate for Debra Assembly constituency, defeating Congress politician Sukumar Das. He contested in the 1982 West Bengal Legislative Assembly election where he was re-elected to Debra, defeating Congress politician Rabindra Nath Bera.
