= Duan railway station =

Railway station in West Bengal, India

Duan

General information
- Location: Duan, Paschim Medinipur district, West Bengal; India
- Coordinates: 22°21′17″N 87°35′06″E
- Elevation: 17 metres (56 ft)
- System: Kolkata Suburban Railway station
- Owner: Indian Railways
- Line: Howrah–Kharagpur line
- Platforms: 3

Construction
- Structure type: Standard on-ground station
- Parking: No
- Cycle facilities: yes

Other information
- Station code: DUAN
- Fare zone: South Eastern Railway

History
- Opened: 1900
- Electrified: 1967–69

Services
Preceding station	Kolkata Suburban Railway	Following station
Balichak towards Midnapore	South Eastern Line Howrah–Kharagpur line	Radhamohanpur towards Howrah Junction
Route map
Location
- Location within West Bengal

Duan railway station, in the Indian state of West Bengal, serves Duan, India in Paschim Medinipur district. It is on the Howrah–Kharagpur line. Its trains run 87 km (54 mi) from Howrah station.

== History ==
Duan railway station is situated in National Highway 6, Debra, West Bengal. Its station code is DUAN. It is a small railway station between Howrah and Kharagpur, and the local EMU services Howrah–Balichak, Howrah–Kharagpur, Santragachi–Kharagpur local, and Howrah–Kharagpur stop there. The Howrah–Kharagpur line was opened in 1900. The Howrah–Kharagpur stretch has three lines. There is a plan to build a fourth line for the Santragachi–Panskura–Kharagpur stretch. The Howrah–Kharagpur line was electrified in 1967–69.
