= Panskura Purba Assembly constituency =

Panskura Purba
- Constituency No. 204 for the West Bengal Legislative Assembly
- Interactive Map Outlining Panskura Purba Assembly Constituency

Constituency details
- Country: India
- Region: East India
- State: West Bengal
- District: Purba Medinipur
- Lok Sabha constituency: Tamluk
- Established: 1951
- Total electors: 186,193
- Reservation: None

Member of Legislative Assembly
- 18th West Bengal Legislative Assembly
- Incumbent Subrata Maity
- Party: BJP
- Alliance: NDA
- Elected year: 2026

Panskura Purba Assembly constituency is an assembly constituency in Purba Medinipur district in the Indian state of West Bengal.

== Overview ==
As per orders of the Delimitation Commission, No. 204 Panskura Purba Assembly constituency is composed of the following: Kolaghat CD Block.

Panskura Purba Assembly constituency is part of No. 30 Tamluk (Lok Sabha constituency).

== Members of the Legislative Assembly ==
Year	Name	Party
1951	Rajani Kanta Pramanick; Panskura (North)	Indian National Congress
1951	Shyama Bhattacharya; Panskura (South)	Indian National Congress
Panskura East
1957	Rajani Kanta Pramanik	Indian National Congress
1962	Rajani Kanta Pramanik	Indian National Congress
1967	Geeta Mukherjee	Communist Party of India
1969	Geeta Mukherjee	Communist Party of India
1971	Geeta Mukherjee	Communist Party of India
1972	Geeta Mukherjee	Communist Party of India
1977	Swades Ranjan Maji	Janata Party
1982	Swades Ranjan Maji	Independent politician
1987	Sibram Basu	Communist Party of India
1991	Sisir Sarkar	Communist Party of India
1996	Biplab Roy Chowdhury	Indian National Congress
2001	Biplab Roy Chowdhury	All India Trinamool Congress
2006	Amiya Kumar Sahoo	Communist Party of India
Constituency renamed as Panskura Purba due to delimitation
2011	Biplab Roy Chowdhury	All India Trinamool Congress
2016	Sheikh Ibrahim Ali	Communist Party of India
2021	Biplab Roy Chowdhury	All India Trinamool Congress
2026	Subrata Maity	Bharatiya Janata Party

== Election results ==
=== 2026 ===
2026 West Bengal Legislative Assembly election: Panskura Purba
Party	Candidate	Votes	%	±%
BJP	Subrata Maity	109,264	49.5	+8.39
AITC	Ashim Kumar Maji	91,361	41.39	−4.58
CPI(M)	Sheikh Ibrahim Ali	11,233	5.09	−5.35
Jatiya Unnayan Party	Alfajuddin Ali Nayek	3,401	1.54	
NOTA	None of the above	1,396	0.63	+0.03
Majority		17,903	8.11	+3.25
Turnout		220,737	92.48	+8.52
BJP gain from AITC		Swing		

=== 2021 ===
2021 West Bengal Legislative Assembly election: Panskura Purba
Party	Candidate	Votes	%	±%
AITC	Biplab Roy Chowdhury	91,213	45.97	
BJP	Debabrata Pattanayek	81,553	41.11	
CPI(M)	Ibrahim Ali Sk	20,717	10.44	
NOTA	None of the above	1,183	0.6	
Majority		9,660	4.86	
Turnout		198,400	83.96	
AITC gain from CPI(M)		Swing		

=== 2016 ===
2016 West Bengal Legislative Assembly election: Panskura Purba
Party	Candidate	Votes	%	±%
CPI(M)	Sheikh Ibrahim Ali	85,334		
AITC	Biplab Roy Chowdhury	80,567		
BJP	Smt. Aparna Laskar	10,041		
SUCI(C)	Narayan Nayak	2,572		
Independent	Amiya Kumar Sahoo	2,181		
NOTA	None of the above	1,864		
Turnout		1,63,577	87.85	
CPI(M) gain from AITC		Swing	10.65#	

.# Swing calculated on LF+Congress vote percentages taken together in 2016.

=== 2011 ===
West Bengal assembly elections, 2011: Panskura Purba
Party	Candidate	Votes	%	±%
AITC	Biplab Roy Chowdhury	82,957	50.71	+3.67#
CPI(M)	Amiya Sahoo	69,790	42.66	−6.98
BJP	Deb Kumar Maity	3,971	2.43	
Independent	Motahar Hossen Mallick	3,649		
People's Democratic Conference of India	Kamarujjaman Khann	1,750		
Independent	Sk. Mahim	1,640		
Turnout		163,577	87.85	
AITC gain from CPI(M)		Swing	10.65#	

.# Swing calculated on Congress+Trinamool Congress vote percentages taken together in 2011.

=== 2006 ===
In the 2006 state assembly elections Amiya Kumar Sahoo of CPI(M) won the Panskura East assembly seat defeating his nearest rival Biplab Ray Chowdhury of Trinamool Congress. Contests in most years were multi cornered but only winners and runners are being mentioned. Biplab Roychowdhury representing Trinamool Congress in 2001 and representing Congress in 1996, defeated Sisir Sarkar of CPI(M). Sisir Sarkar of CPI(M) defeated Biplab Roy Choudhury of Congress in 1991. Sibram Basu of CPI(M) defeated Rabindra Bag of Congress in 1987. Swades Ranjan Maji, Independent/ Janata Party, defeated Biplab Roy Choudhury representing ICS in 1982, and Adhir Kumar Chatterjee of Forward Bloc in 1977.

=== 2001 ===
West Bengal assembly elections, 2001: Panskura East
Party	Candidate	Votes	%	±%
AITC	Biplab Roy Chowdhury	64,805		
CPI(M)	Sisir Kumar Sarkar	62,499		
BJP	Narayan Kinkar Mishra	3,668		
Independent	Anurupa Das	2,324		
Janata Dal (United)	Nikhil Jana	1,073		
Independent	Amiya Maity	971		
Turnout		135,340	83.51	
Swing to AITC from CPI(M)		Swing		

.# Swing calculated on Trinamool Congress+Congress vote percentages taken together in 2001.

=== 1996 ===
West Bengal assembly elections, 1996: Panskura East
Party	Candidate	Votes	%	±%
INC	Biplab Roy Chowdhury	62,496	47,65	+3.67#
CPI(M)	Sisir Kumar Sarkar	62,359	47,55	−6.98
BJP	Tushar Kanti Das	2,724	2.43	
Independent	Haripada Pramanik	2,367		
Independent	Hyder Mallick	1,073		
Turnout		131,151	87.89	
INC gain from CPI(M)		Swing		

=== 1972 ===
Geeta Mukherjee of CPI won the Panskura East seat in 1972, 1971, 1969 and 1967 defeating Amar Prasad Chakravarty of Forward Bloc, Birbhadra Gouri of Bangla Congress, Shyamdas Bhattacharya of Congress and Saradindu Samanta of Congress. Rajani Kanta Pramanik of Congress won in 1962 and 1957. In independent first election in 1951, the two Panskura seats were named Panskura North and Panskura South. While Rajanikanta Pramanik of Congress won the Panskura North seat, Shyama Bhattacharya of Congress won the Panskura South seat.
