= Selima Khatun =

Indian politician

Member of the West Bengal Legislative Assembly
- In office 2016–2021
- Preceded by: Radhakanta Maiti
- Succeeded by: Humayun Kabir
- Constituency: Debra

Personal details
- Political party: All India Trinamool Congress
- Education: Masters of Arts in Bengali (Vidyasagar University)
- Occupation: Teacher, Politician

Selima Khatun (born 1982) also known as Bibi is an Indian politician who served as a Member of the West Bengal Legislative Assembly from Debra Assembly constituency since 2016 to 2021. She had represented All India Trinamool Congress, a political party led by Mamata Banerjee. She managed to win 2016 West Bengal Legislative Assembly election with a margin of 11908 votes against the representatives of Communist Party of India (Marxist) and Bharatiya Janata Party.

== Biography ==
Selima Khatun completed her Post graduation in Master of Arts in Bengali from Vidyasagar University in 2005.

She is serving as a Teacher at a High school and her husband is an Assistant professor in a B.ed College.
