= Panskura Banamali College =

College in Panskura, India

Panskura Banamali College (Autonomous)
- Other name: Panskura Banamali College (Autonomous)
- Type: Undergraduate & Post Graduate College
- Established: 1960; 66 years ago
- Founder: Banamali Khatua
- Affiliations: Vidyasagar University
- Principal: Dr. Nandan Bhattacharyya
- Location: Kanakpur, Panskura, West Bengal, 721152, India; 22.3967411°N 87.7390933°E
- Campus: Urban
- Website: http://www.panskurabanamalicollege.org/

- Location within West Bengal Location within India

Panskura Banamali College is located in Panskura, Purba Medinipur district, West Bengal, India. It offers undergraduate and postgraduate degrees in Science, Arts, and Commerce branches. This institution was established in 1960. It is affiliated with the Vidyasagar University.

== History ==
Panskura Banamali College was established in 1960 as a result of the sincere effort of the Late Banamali Charan Khatua, a wealthy and cultured person of Panskura. Local gentleman late Hasmat Ali Khan and his co-sharers donated the land for this college. Late Banmali Charan Khatua took the responsibility of developing the college building. This college eventually came to be named after its principal donor, Banamali Charan Khatua. This college continues to be a unique symbol of aspiration for higher education and excellence in the locality. There are many notable alumni who have achieved great success in their lives, like Debabrata Chatterjee, an IRS officer and a former student of the college. This college was affiliated with the University of Calcutta until 1984. In 1985, the affiliation of this college was changed from the University of Calcutta to Vidyasagar University. University Grants Commission has given Autonomous status to Panskura Banamali College from the 2018-19 session.

== Location ==
The college is situated on the road connecting Panskura Rly station and the National Highway 6 (India), nearer to Panskura station, 721151. Panskura is a model station, 71 km from Howrah on the way to Kharagpur (SE Rly). There are frequent local train services between Howrah and Kharagpur and some passenger and express trains also stop here. It is easy to reach Panskura by train or by bus from any direction.

== Departments and courses ==
The college offers different undergraduate and postgraduate courses in the science, arts, and commerce branch. This college aims at imparting education to the undergraduates of lower- and middle-class people of Panskura and its adjoining areas.

=== Science ===
The science faculty consists of the departments of chemistry, physics, mathematics, computer science and application, botany, zoology, physiology, biotechnology, economics, data science, nutrition, medical lab technology, and microbiology.

=== Arts and commerce ===
The arts and commerce faculty consists of the departments of Bengali, English, Santali, Sanskrit, history, political science, philosophy, geography, education, physical education, music, and commerce (accounting and finance).

== Accreditation ==
The college is recognized by the University Grants Commission (UGC). It was also accredited by the National Assessment and Accreditation Council (NAAC), and awarded A grade, an accreditation that has since then expired.

== Notable alumni ==
- Sheikh Jahangir Karim (born 1952), five-time member of the Legislative Assembly
- Sheikh Ibrahim Ali (born 1989), MLA of Panskura

== See also ==
- List of institutions of higher education in West Bengal
- Education in India
- Education in West Bengal
