= Sheikh Ibrahim Ali =

West Bengal politician

Member of West Bengal Legislative Assembly
- In office 2016–2021
- Preceded by: Biplab Roy Chowdhury
- Succeeded by: Biplab Roy Chowdhury
- Constituency: Panskura Purba

Personal details
- Born: 1989 (age 36–37) Midnapore district, West Bengal
- Party: Communist Party of India (Marxist)
- Education: Panskura Banamali College

Sheikh Ibrahim Ali is an Indian politician belonging to the Communist Party of India (Marxist). He was the MLA of Panskura Purba Assembly constituency in the West Bengal Legislative Assembly.

== Early life and family ==
Ali was born in 1989 to a Bengali family of Muslim Sheikhs in Midnapore district, West Bengal. He is the son of Sheikh Idris Ali. He graduated with a Bachelor of Arts in Bengali language from Panskura Banamali College, Vidyasagar University in 2008.

== Career ==
Ali contested the 2016 West Bengal Legislative Assembly election where he ran as a Communist Party of India (Marxist) candidate for Panskura Purba Assembly constituency, defeating Trinamool politician Biplab Roy Chowdhury. He lost to Chowdhury in the next election in 2021.
