= Loyada, Paschim Medinipur =

Loyada
- Village
- Location in West Bengal, India Loyada (India)
- Coordinates: 22.447611°N 87.629606°E
- Country: India
- State: West Bengal
- District: Paschim Medinipur

Population (2011)
  - Total: 1,520

Languages*
  - Official: Bengali, Santali, English
- Time zone: UTC+5:30 (IST)
- PIN: 721136
- Telephone/STD code: 03222
- Lok Sabha constituency: Ghatal
- Vidhan Sabha constituency: Debra
- Website: paschimmedinipur.gov.in

Loyada (also spelled Lowada) is a village in the Debra CD block in the Kharagpur subdivision of the Paschim Medinipur district in the state of West Bengal, India.

== Geography ==
Cities and towns in the northern part of Kharagpur subdivision (including Khararagpur I & II, Debra and Pingla CD blocks) of Paschim Medinipur district
M: municipal city/ town, CT: census town, R: rural/ urban centre, H: historical/ religious centre, F: facilities
Owing to space constraints in the small map, the actual locations in a larger map may vary slightly

=== Location ===
Lowada is located at 22.447611°N 87.629606°E.

=== Area overview ===
Kharagpur subdivision, shown partly in the map alongside, mostly has alluvial soils, except in two CD blocks in the west – Kharagpur I and Keshiary, which mostly have lateritic soils. Around 74% of the total cultivated area is cropped more than once. With a density of population of 787 per km^{2}nearly half of the district's population resides in this subdivision. 14.33% of the population lives in urban areas and 86.67% lives in the rural areas.

Note: The map alongside presents some of the notable locations in the subdivision. All places marked in the map are linked in the larger full screen map.

== Demographics ==
According to the 2011 Census of India, Loyada had a total population of 1,520, of which 780 (51%) were males and 740 (49%) were females. There were 211 persons in the age range of 0–6 years. The total number of literate persons in Loyada was 992 (75.78% of the population over 6 years).

.*For language details see Debra (community development block)#Language and religion

== Education ==
Lowada High School is a Bengali-medium coeducational institution established in 1952. The school has facilities for teaching from class V to class XII. It has a library with 2,000 books, 10 computers and a playground.

Lowada Balika Vidyalaya is a Bengali-medium girls only institution established in 1971. The school has facilities for teaching from class V to class XII. It has a library with 534 books and 4 computers.

== Culture ==
David J. McCutchion mentions:

- The Gopinath temple of the Mukherjee family as standard West Bengal type pancha-ratna, brick temple with terracotta, built in 1805
- The Sridhara temple of the Mukherjee family as a flat roofed or chandni type, with terracotta and stucco work
- The Radha-Govinda temple as a smooth rekha deul with a porch having low-founded pyramidal roof, built in 1860, having rich terracotta.

== Laoada picture gallery ==
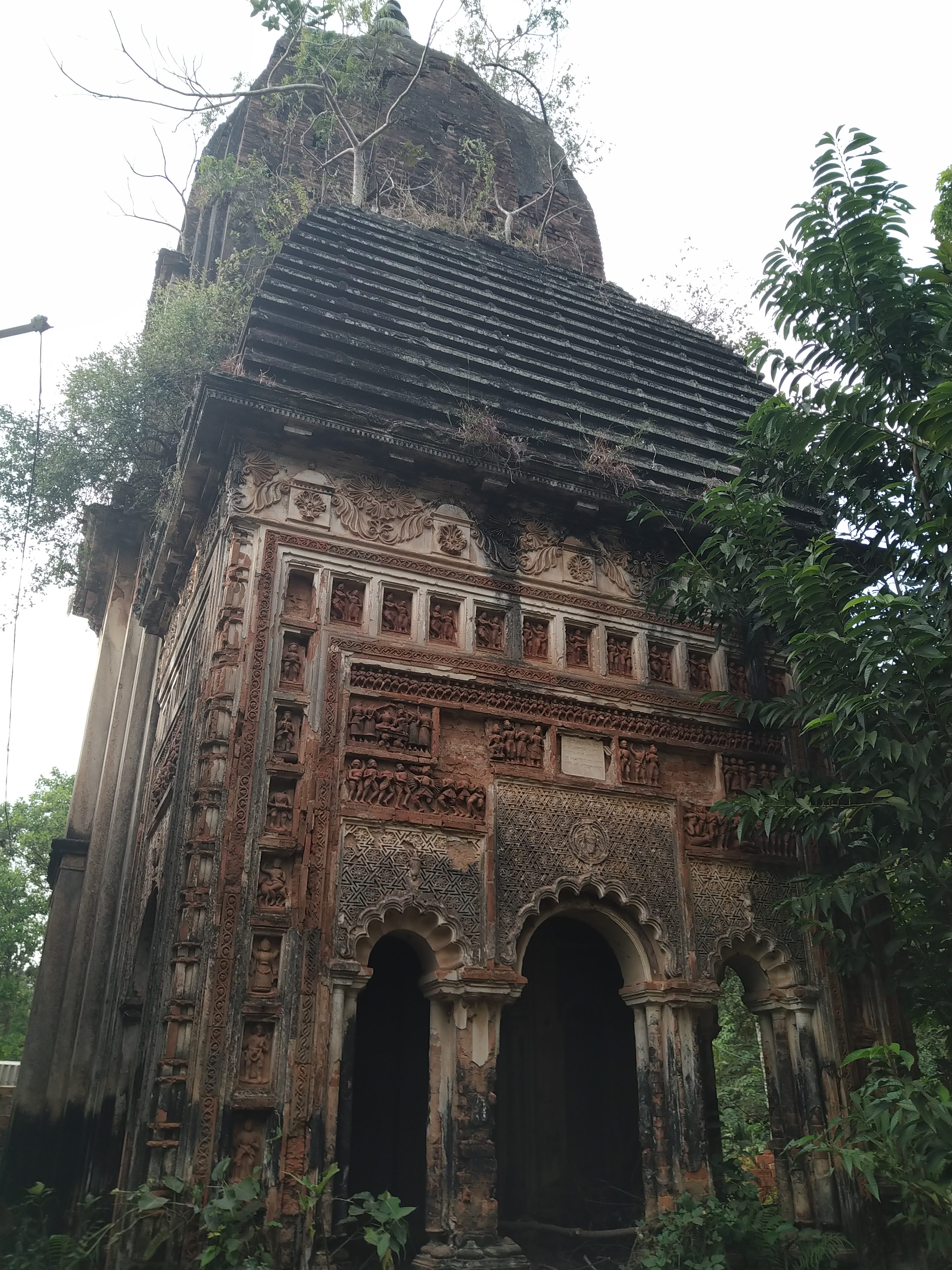
Radhagobinda Jiu temple: Shikhar deul with porch in front

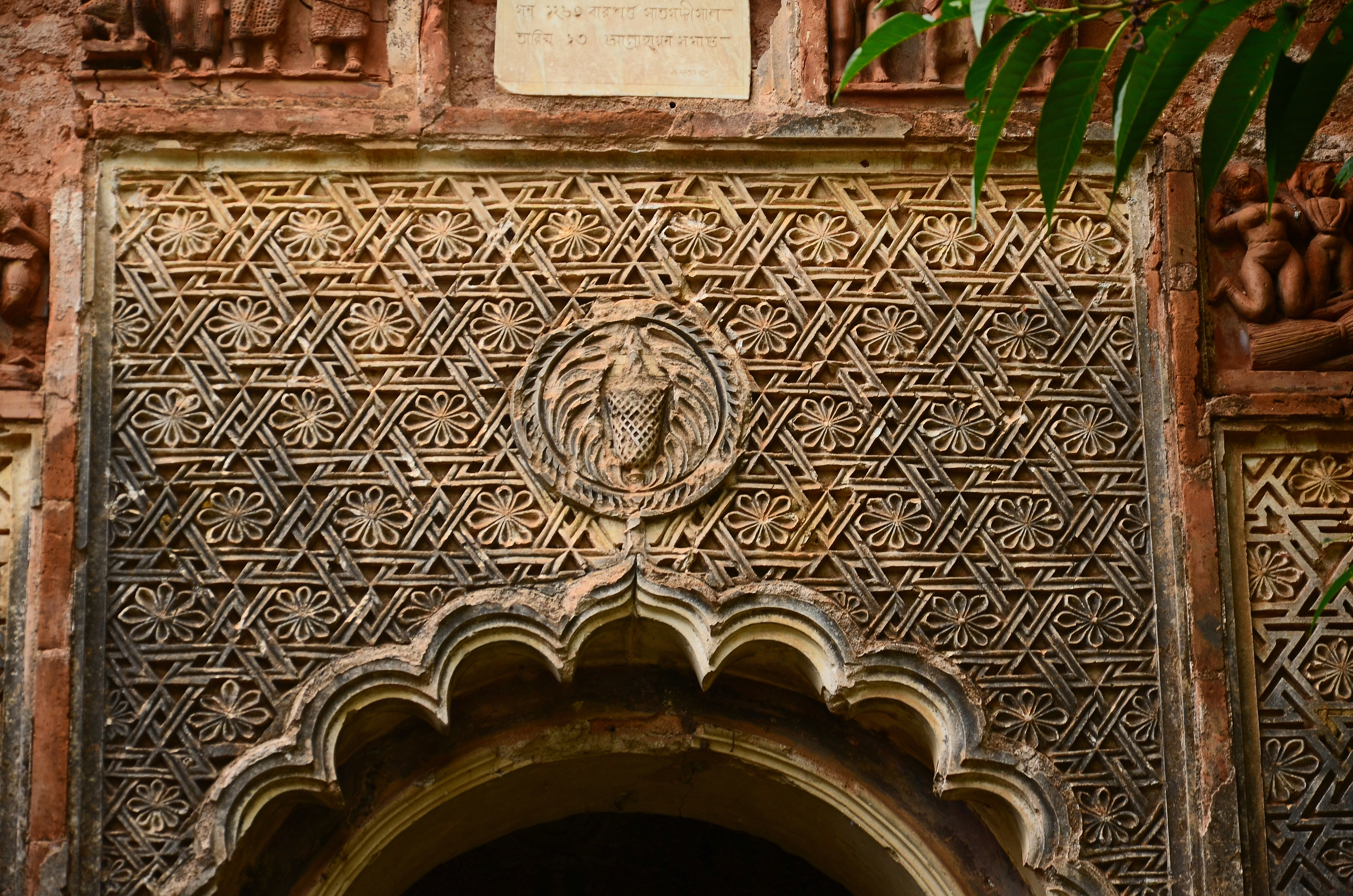
Terracotta decoration in Radhagobindajiu temple

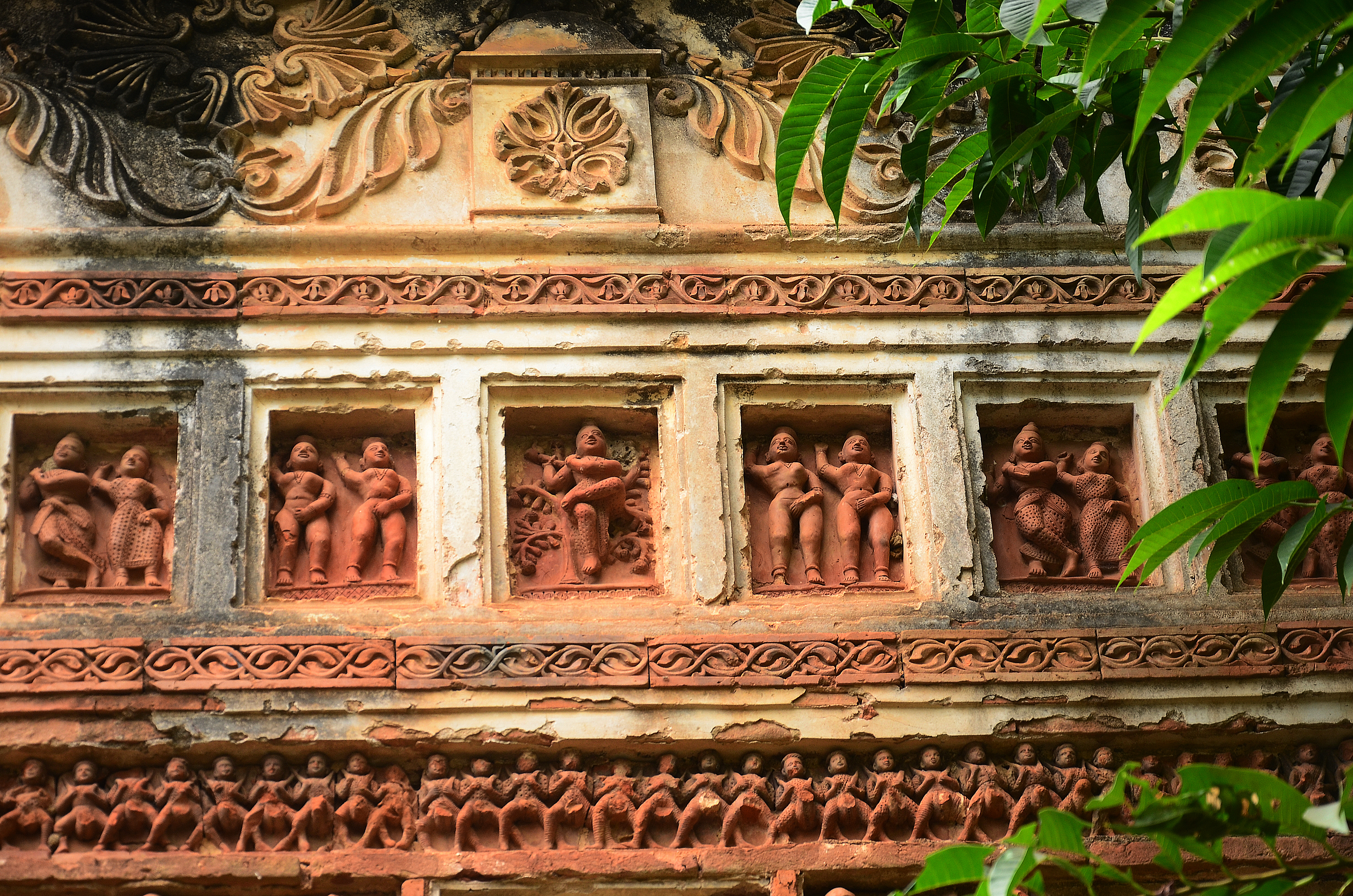
Terracotta decoration in Radhagobindajiu temple
