= Humayun Kabir (politician, former police officer) =

Indian former IPS officer and politician From West Bengal (b.1961)

Minister of State, Government of West Bengal
- Independent Charge
- In office 10 May 2021 – 3 August 2022
- Governor: Jagdeep Dhankhar
- Chief Minister: Mamata Banerjee
- Department: Technical Education, Training and Skill Development
- Preceded by: Purnendu Basu
- Succeeded by: Indranil Sen

Member of the West Bengal Legislative Assembly
- In office 6 May 2021 – 4 May 2026
- Preceded by: Radhakanta Maiti
- Succeeded by: Subhashis Om
- Constituency: Debra

Personal details
- Born: 3 April 1961 (age 65) Debra, West Bengal, India
- Party: All India Trinamool Congress
- Parent: Sk. Ashed Ali (father)
- Education: M.Sc; Ph.D (Botany); Kalyani University (1991)
- Occupation: Politician, social worker
- Police career
- Service: Indian Police Service
- Department: West Bengal Police
- Service years: 2003 - 2021
- Status: Resigned
- Rank: Inspector General
- Badge no.: 20032056

Humayun Kabir (born 3 April 1961) is an Indian politician and former police officer from West Bengal, who is serving as member of West Bengal Legislative Assembly from Debra constituency since 2021, member of Trinamool Congress, he has also served as cabinet minister of state under Third Banerjee ministry, from 2021 to 2022.

== Early life and education ==
Kabir was born on 3 April 1961 to a Bengali family of Muslim Sheikhs in the village of Debra in Midnapore district, West Bengal. He was the son of Sheikh Arsed Ali and Zinat-un-Nesa Begum. He earned his Ph.D. in Botany from Kalyani University in 1991.

== Police Service ==
Kabir joined IPS through West Bengal State Police Service in 2003. His first posting was in DSP in North 24 Parganas. At that time, Hatkata Dilip, a renowned criminal who is reportedly close to several CPI(M) leaders, was apprehended by Kabir. He was demoted by the then state government as punishment.

During 2014 elections, he was sent to Murshidabad as Police Superintendent. He was alleged to have connections of supporting Adhir Ranjan Chowdhury, the then Member of Lok Sabha. So, he was sent to compulsory waiting again.

In 2019, he was transferred to Chandannagar as Commissioner of Police. In 2021, few months before state election, he arrested some BJP workers for raising the incendiary and provocative slogans at a rally. He resigned from his service after that.

== Political career ==
Kabir joined Trinamool Congress in February 2021 at a party rally in Kalna in the presence of West Bengal Chief Minister Mamata Banerjee. He received ticket of contesting from his native town Debra. He won the seat on 2 May 2021. He was appointed cabinet minister of state (independent charge) on 10 May 2021. He was removed from the cabinet in the next year on 3 August.
