= Debra, Paschim Medinipur =

Debra
- Village
- Location in West Bengal, India Debra (India)
- Coordinates: 22°23′26.2″N 87°34′02.3″E
- Country: India
- State: West Bengal
- District: Paschim Medinipur

Population (2011)
  - Total: 2,347

Languages*
  - Official: Bengali, Santali, English
- Time zone: UTC+5:30 (IST)
- PIN: 721126 (Debra Bazar)
- Telephone/STD code: 03225
- Lok Sabha constituency: Ghatal
- Vidhan Sabha constituency: Debra
- Website: paschimmedinipur.gov.in

Debra is a village in the Debra CD block in the Kharagpur subdivision of the Paschim Medinipur district in the state of West Bengal, India.

== Geography ==
Cities and towns in the northern part of Kharagpur subdivision (including Khararagpur I & II, Debra and Pingla CD blocks) of Paschim Medinipur district
M: municipal city/ town, CT: census town, R: rural/ urban centre, H: historical/ religious centre, F: facilities
Owing to space constraints in the small map, the actual locations in a larger map may vary slightly

=== Location ===
Debra is located at 22°23′26.2″N 87°34′02.3″E.

=== Area overview ===
Kharagpur subdivision, shown partly in the map alongside, mostly has alluvial soils, except in two CD blocks in the west – Kharagpur I and Keshiary, which mostly have lateritic soils. Around 74% of the total cultivated area is cropped more than once. With a density of population of 787 per km^{2}nearly half of the district's population resides in this subdivision. 14.33% of the population lives in urban areas and 86.67% lives in the rural areas.

Note: The map alongside presents some of the notable locations in the subdivision. All places marked in the map are linked in the larger full screen map.

== Demographics ==
According to the 2011 Census of India Debra had a total population of 2,347 of which 1,184 (50%) were males and 1,163 (50%) were females. Population in the age range 0–6 years was 228. The total number of literate persons in Debra was 1,730 (73.71% of the population over 6 years).

.*For language details see Debra (community development block)#Language and religion

== Civic administration ==
=== Police station ===
Debra police station has jurisdiction over Debra CD block. Which is situated at Balichak.

== Transport ==
National Highway 6, running from Kolkata to Mumbai, passes through Debra.

There is a station at Balichak on the Howrah-Kharagpur line. It is 90.8 km from Howrah station.

== Education ==
Debra Thana Sahid Kshudiram Smriti Mahavidyalaya was established in the year 2006 under Vidyasagar University Medinipur.

There are a number of schools/ institutions in Debra:

- Maa Sarada Vidyamandir
- Debra Kinder Garden School
- Anganbari School Debra
- Sister Nivedita School
- Debra Primary School
- Debra Harimati Saraswat Vidyamandir

== Healthcare ==
Debra Rural Hospital, with 40 beds at Debra Bazar, is the major government medical facility in the Debra CD block.

Debra Superspeciality hospital is functioning and is an improvement over the facilities offered by the Rural Hospital, but with specialists leaving frequently, many patients have to face the earlier trouble of being referred to Kharagpur/ Midnapore and that often leads to indignation and trouble.
