= Debra Assembly constituency =

Debra
- Constituency No. 229 for the West Bengal Legislative Assembly
- Interactive Map Outlining Debra Assembly Constituency

Constituency details
- Country: India
- Region: East India
- State: West Bengal
- District: Paschim Medinipur
- Lok Sabha constituency: Ghatal
- Established: 1957
- Total electors: 184,213
- Reservation: None

Member of Legislative Assembly
- 18th West Bengal Legislative Assembly
- Incumbent Subhashis Om
- Party: BJP
- Elected year: 2026
- Preceded by: Humayun Kabir

Most Successful parties from Debra assembly
1. Communist Party of India (Marxist) (7 times) (41.2%)
2. Indian National Congress (5 times) (29.4%)
3. All India Trinamool Congress (3 time) (17.6%)
4. Bangla Congress (1 time) (5.90%)
5. Bharatiya Janata Party (1 time) (5.90%)

Debra Assembly constituency is an assembly constituency in Paschim Medinipur district in the Indian state of West Bengal.

== Members of the Legislative Assembly ==
Year	Name	Party
1957	Mohini Mohan Pati	Indian National Congress
1962	Santosh Kumar Mukherjee	Indian National Congress
1967	K. Chakraborty	Bangla Congress
1969	Bijoy Krishna Samanta	Indian National Congress
1971	Rabindranath Bera	Indian National Congress
1972	Rabindranath Bera	Indian National Congress
1977	Syed Moazzam Hossain	Communist Party of India (Marxist)
1982	Syed Moazzam Hossain	Communist Party of India (Marxist)
1987	Sheikh Jahangir Karim	Communist Party of India (Marxist)
1991	Sheikh Jahangir Karim	Communist Party of India (Marxist)
1996	Sheikh Jahangir Karim	Communist Party of India (Marxist)
2001	Sheikh Jahangir Karim	Communist Party of India (Marxist)
2006	Sheikh Jahangir Karim	Communist Party of India (Marxist)
2011	Radhakanta Maiti	All India Trinamool Congress
2016	Selima Khatun(Bibi)	All India Trinamool Congress
2021	Humayun Kabir	All India Trinamool Congress
2026	Subhashis Om	Bharatiya Janata Party

== Overview ==
As per orders of the Delimitation Commission, No. 229 Debra Assembly constituency is composed of the following: Debra community development block.

Debra Assembly constituency is part of No. 32 Ghatal (Lok Sabha constituency). It was earlier part of Panskura (Lok Sabha constituency).

== Election results ==
=== 2026 ===
2026 West Bengal Legislative Assembly election: Debra
Party	Candidate	Votes	%	±%
BJP	Subhashis Om	114,463	52.67	▲11.36
AITC	Rajib Banerjee	85,662	39.42	▼7.37
CPI(M)	Sumit Adhikari	12,473	5.74	▼4.38
NOTA	None of the above	1,087	0.5	▼0.16
Majority		28,801	13.25	▲7.77
Turnout		217,323	93.59	▲6.11
BJP gain from AITC		Swing		

=== 2021 ===
2021 West Bengal Legislative Assembly election: Debra
Party	Candidate	Votes	%	±%
AITC	Humayun Kabir	95,850	46.79	
BJP	Bharati Ghosh	84,624	41.31	
CPI(M)	Prankrishna Mondal	20,723	10.12	
NOTA	None of the above	1,353	0.66	
Majority		11,226	5.48	
Turnout		204,866	87.48	
AITC hold		Swing		

=== 2016 ===
2016 West Bengal Legislative Assembly election: Debra
Party	Candidate	Votes	%	±%
AITC	Selima Khatun	90,773	48.61	▼1.96
CPI(M)	Jahangir Karim Sk	78,865	42.23	▼3.17
BJP	Sukumar Bhunia	15,428	8.26	▲5.98
SUCI	Dipankar Maity	1,667	0.89	
Majority		11, 908	6.38	▲1.21
Turnout		186,733	89.33	▼3.21
AITC hold		Swing		

=== 2011 ===
2011 West Bengal state assembly election: Debra
Party	Candidate	Votes	%	±%
AITC	Radhakanta Maiti	86,215	50.57	▲6.52#
CPI(M)	Sk. Sorab Hossein	77,402	45.40	▼10.56
BJP	Dilip Kumar Roy	3,893	2.28	
IPFB	Tanbir Murshed Khan	2,969	1.74	
Majority		8,813	5.17	
Turnout		170,479	92.54	
AITC gain from CPI(M)		Swing	17.08#	

.# Swing calculated on Congress+Trinamool Congress vote percentages taken together in 2006.

=== 2006 ===
Sheikh Jahangir Karim of Communist Party of India (Marxist) (CPI(M)) won the Debra assembly seat, five times in a row from 1987 to 2006, defeating Mrigendra Nath Maiti of Trinamool Congress in 2006, Radha Kanta Maiti of Trinamool Congress in 2001 Rabindra Nath Bera of Indian National Congress in 1996, and Sk. Mohammed Daud of Congress in 1991 and 1987. Contests in most years were multi cornered but only winners and runners are being mentioned. Syed Moazzam Hossain of CPI(M) defeated Rabindra Nath Bera of Congress in 1982 and Sukumar Das of Congress in 1977.

=== 1972 ===
Rabindra Nath Bera of Congress won in 1972 and 1971. Bijoy Krishna Samanata won in 1969. K.Chakraborty of Bangla Congress won in 1967. Santosh Kumar Mukherjee of Congress won in 1962. Mohini Mohan Pati of Congress won in 1957.
