= USI =

USI or Usi may stand for:

== Organizations ==
- USI Tech, a suspected ponzi scheme
- USI Wireless, a Minnesota internet service provider
- Union of Independent Trade Unions (Portugal)
- Union of Students in Ireland, the representative body for students' unions in Ireland
- Unione Sindacale Italiana, an Italian trade union
- Union Solidarity International (USi), an international labour organising support organisation
- Unlimited Software Inc., see Distinctive Software

== Places ==
- Usı, Tatarstan, a place in Russia
- Usi County, a county in westernmost Chagang province, North Korea
- United States of Indonesia, a state in Southeast Asia from 1949 to 1950
- University of Southern Indiana, a University located near Evansville, Indiana, United States
- University of Siegen, a University located in Siegen, North Rhine-Westphalia, Germany
- Università della Svizzera italiana, the University of Italian-speaking Switzerland

== Other uses ==
- Usi (food), a starch dish of the Urhobo people of Nigeria
- Uši, an album by Czech band Uz jsme doma
- User System Interaction, a postgraduate engineering design program in the Netherlands
- Unique Student Identifier, a unique identifier for all higher education students in Australia
- Unique Swap Identifier, see Unique Transaction Identifier, identifier for trades mandated by financial markets regulation
- Universal Stylus Initiative for interoperable active pen styluses for touchscreen devices
- USI: Under Special Investigation, 2010 TV series
