= Blood Bricks Campaign =

Modern anti-slavery campaign

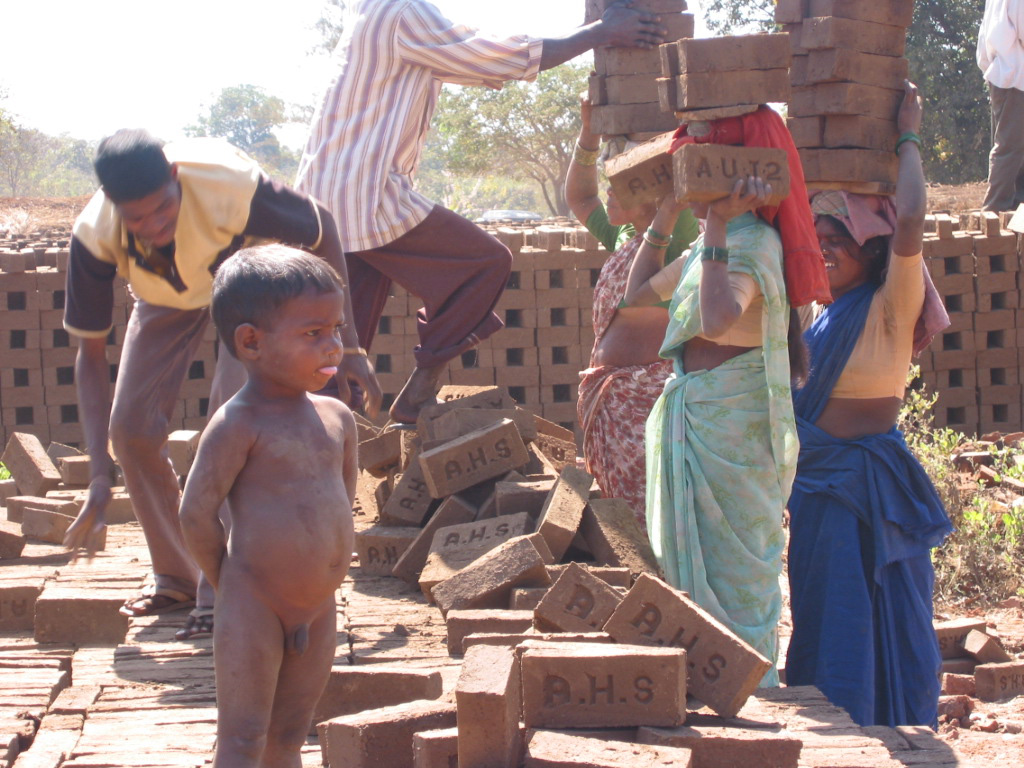
- Founded: 13 January 2014
- Founders: Union Solidarity International, Prayas, Action Aid Association, War on Want, and Thompsons Solicitors
- Type: Non-Profit Organization
- Purpose: Activism
- Region served: India

The Blood Bricks Campaign is an international campaign that focuses on fighting against the use of modern slavery in the Indian bricks kiln industry, while also exposing companies that use slavery-produced bricks in their supply chain. It was launched in 2014 by multiple, different organizations including Union Solidarity International (USi), Prayas, Action Aid Association, War on Want, and Thompsons Solicitors. This campaign's objectives include supporting unionizing efforts by workers, applying pressure to state and federal governments to enforce or amend laws, identifying companies that use bricks from bonded or forced labour, and bringing attention to the working conditions in the brick industry in India, as well as other parts of the world.

== Background ==
=== Modern slavery in the Indian brick kiln industry ===
In India, the brick kiln industry plays an integral part within the country’s construction sector, and is estimated to contribute four billion US dollars to the Indian economy annually. According to the Anti-Slavery International, there are an estimated 12,500 brick production units in India alone, which employ approximately 10–23 million workers.

Due to the sheer competitiveness of the brick kiln industry, employers, unable to reduce costs of materials, attempt to reduce production costs through the use of debt-bondage and child labour. As this industry works seasonally, employers prey on migrant and minority populations from low socio-economic statuses and recruit through the use of an advance payment system. This system allows labourers to, essentially, survive the monsoon (non-working) season as they receive no other form of income. However, by contracting out this debt, they are unknowingly forced into bondage. Furthermore, due to the seasonality of the brick industry, workers wages are frequently withheld to the end of the season. These means that workers often do not receive pay for approximately eight to ten months, and as a result, are often lower than agreed upon. These corrupt forms of payment systems reduce the control that the brick kiln workers have over their working conditions, as well as limits their ability to leave.

This unequal system between employers and employees within the brick kiln industry is exacerbated by the fact that workers do not receive daily wages, but are paid by a piece work system. This means that the workers receive compensation for every 1,500 bricks made. This system leads to adult, male labourers relying on the help of their family to meet the demand of their employers, and thus, receive sufficient compensation. This model has been criticized for several reasons. Firstly, since wages are paid to the male head of the family, female workers often do not receive compensation, and are consequently reliant on their male family members. Furthermore, this system incentivizes child labour, as households with more members will need to produce more bricks to properly support their families. Child labour is also occasionally used as a bargaining power by brick kiln workers, as it is often their only tool to incentivize employers to increase wages or provide additional benefits. Overall, this significantly decreases the attendance of children living on brick kilns to primary school or early childhood care, despite this being a legal obligation of the Indian government. Moreover, this piece work system promotes long hours by workers operating within the brick kiln industry. It has been reported that brick kiln labourers are working approximately 12-hour days, with children workers between the age of five to fourteen working seven to nine hours a day. This system also limits workers ability to attain minimum wage, with many only receiving two to three US dollars a day.

Within the brick kiln industry, there is no proper maintenance of records as many contracts are made verbally between the employers and the workers. As a result, there is very little accountability of the employers, limiting the brick kiln workers' ability to take legal action when their compensation is lower than agreed upon or when their worker rights are being violated.

=== Formation of the campaign ===
In reaction to the extreme human right violations and the use of contemporary slavery within the Indian brick kiln industry, the Blood Bricks Campaign was launched on 13 January 2014 by several international organizations. It was launched to mobilize human rights campaigners and non-governmental organizations to help increase the public services provided to brick kilns, combat the use of child and bonded labour, as well as to aid with the organization and education of brick kiln workers.

This campaign’s title was created in reaction to the significant prevalence of physical illnesses that occur in the brick kiln industry due to the poor working conditions, particularly the smoke produced from the kiln. Additionally, the campaign's title was also inspired by the popular neologism, blood diamond. The campaign's organizers hoped that this reference would help to capture a similar sense of geopolitical injustice in regards to the issue of modern slavery in the Indian brick kiln industry.

Although there are hopes for the expansion of this campaign to other countries, as of today, its efforts are primarily focused in India. However, simply the act of creating a common language about this issue and many of their activities have, somewhat inadvertently, had positive effects on improving working conditions of brick kilns in other countries, particularly Pakistan, Bangladesh, and Cambodia.

== Campaign details ==
=== Structure ===
The Blood Bricks Campaign was launched by various organizations, including Union Solidarity International, Prayas, Action Aid Association, War on Want, and Thompsons Solicitors. This campaign operates as a trans-national network with the hopes to generate a unified message and a common language about the issue of modern slavery in the Indian brick kiln industry. This campaign actively avoids a hierarchical system, with each organization working together as equal partners, while also helping to provide different sources of support and expertise.

=== Funding ===
The Blood Bricks Campaign appears to be primarily financed through donations. However, as this campaign is a movement implemented by many, different international organizations, one would need to analyze the funding of the individual organizations to truly understand the financing of the Blood Bricks movement.

Donations can be made to the Blood Bricks Campaign directly through its online website.

== Objectives ==
=== Enforcement and amendment of domestic laws ===
The Blood Bricks Campaign aims to pressure India State and Federal governments to enforce or amend domestic labour laws, particularly within the brick kiln industry. In India, there are already several existing laws in place that aim to protect workers, including the minimum wage act of 1948, the bonded labour act of 1976, and the interstate migrant workers act of 1979, all of which are currently being violated within the Indian brick kiln industry. Furthermore, this campaign attempts to pressure the Indian government to create or further develop laws that aim to bring an end to modern slavery. For instance, it fights for the creation of a mandatory minimum wage, which is still simply regulated by Indian States, and not considered a federal issue. Hence, this campaign attempts to generate the conditions for these necessary changes through the use of the media, letters, petitions, as well as by applying international pressure.

=== Exposure of companies ===
This campaign identifies and exposes companies that breach domestic and international laws due to the direct or indirect use of bricks produced from debt-bondage, child labour, or by workers who do not receive minimum wages.

=== Identification of legal precedents and gaps ===
One of the goals of the Blood Bricks Campaign is to identify legal precedents and legal gaps within Indian and international labour law, and make efforts to ameliorate the breaches that allow for corrupt use of labour.

=== Worker compensation ===
This campaign helps to identify brick kiln workers that can receive compensation and help to provide the necessary legal aid. Moreover, they identify corporations liable to fines and attempt to take lawful action.

=== Supporting unionizing efforts ===
The Blood Bricks Campaign helps to support strikes and unionizing efforts within the brick kiln industry.

== Accomplishments ==
=== Wage rises ===
Since the formation of this campaign, wages for brick kiln workers have increased by 70% in many areas. This rise in wages was largely due to the unionizing efforts of brick kiln workers. The Blood Bricks Campaign has helped to organize unions in brick kilns situated in various locations across India, including Gujarat, Rahasthan, and Andhra Pradesh. This has helped significantly raise wages in these areas, with Gujarat wages going up by 145%. They have also helped to support strike efforts, which has been associated with an increase in wages.

=== Settling of wage disputes & the release of bonded individuals ===
This campaign has helped to provide legal and financial support to brick kiln workers through the process of filing and settling wage disputes. It has allowed for hundred of labour lawsuits, which demand proper compensation, to be resolved. These legal cases have also helped to bring this issue to the attention to Indian Federal Government and demonstrate the need to amend laws regarding bonded-labour and minimum wage. Furthermore, it has helped to release thousands of workers from bondage in multiple brick kilns throughout India, particularly in Gujarat, Rahasthan, and Andhra Pradesh.

=== Awareness ===
Since the majority of the brick kiln workers are illiterate or have low levels of education, it was observed that many of the labourers had little to no knowledge of labour laws in India. Thus, this campaign has helped to increase the understanding of the rights of workers in the brick kiln industry. This knowledge has helped workers to recognize when their rights are being violated and how to act accordingly.

This campaign has also helps bring this issue to the attention of the public, as well as domestic and international governments. Recently, this goal was demonstrated through the Blood Bricks Campaign's efforts to spread reports of brick kiln workers having their hands cut off after trying to escape. This was done to help highlight the working conditions of the Indian brick kiln industry within the mass media, while also using these reports to pressure governments to amend and uphold labour and anti-slavery laws.

The Blood Bricks Campaign has also adopted the hashtag, #BloodBricks, in an attempt to increase their online presence and, thus, bring more attention to this issue.

=== Government provision of public services ===
The Blood Brick Campaign has put pressure on the Indian government to deliver public services to brick kilns, such as primary schools, early childhood care, and health care services. It has also brought the need for these services on brick kiln plants to the attention of different non-governmental organizations and church establishments, many of which, have taken strides to fill these gaps.

=== Amendment of domestic laws ===
Since the formation of the Blood Bricks Campaign, the movement for the creation of a mandatory, national minimum wage in India has taken off. Activists have called for a minimum monthly salary of approximately 140 US dollars, as well as sick and holiday pay. Currently, the Indian Ministry of Labour and Employment is drafting a proposal to meet these demands, and also include social security benefits, such as health insurance and maternity leave.

=== Amendment of international laws ===
In the United Kingdom, organizations supporting the Blood Bricks Campaign, including Union Solidarity International and Thompsons Solicitors, have helped support motions and bills in UK parliament that aim to help bring an end to modern slavery. This includes the Modern Slavery Bill, which is an act designed to prevent slavery and trafficking through several important provisions, including legally requiring companies to annually declare the measures they have taken to remove the use of slavery from their supply chains. Furthermore, these humanitarian organizations have helped to reinforce this bill and have highlighted how it directly relates to the Blood Bricks Campaign with the early day motion 362 in 2015. This motion, sponsored primarily by Jim Sheridan, detailed the human right violations occurring in the Indian brick kiln industry, while also calling for the UK Government to bring forth legislation to ameliorate the situation and to raise these issues during international negotiations.

Moreover, in reaction to pressure from activists and humanitarian groups, the United Nations changed the final draft of the Sustainable Development Goals in 2016 to include Goal 8.7, which calls for the eradication of modern slavery and forced labour. This UN initiative has helped to frame this topic as a global issue, while also ensuring that countries promise to uphold labour laws in order to help amend these human rights violations.

== See also ==
- Labour in India
- Indian labour law
- Interstate Migrant Workmen Act 1979
- Slavery in India
- Child labour in India
