= Garbeta =

Garhbeta
- Census town
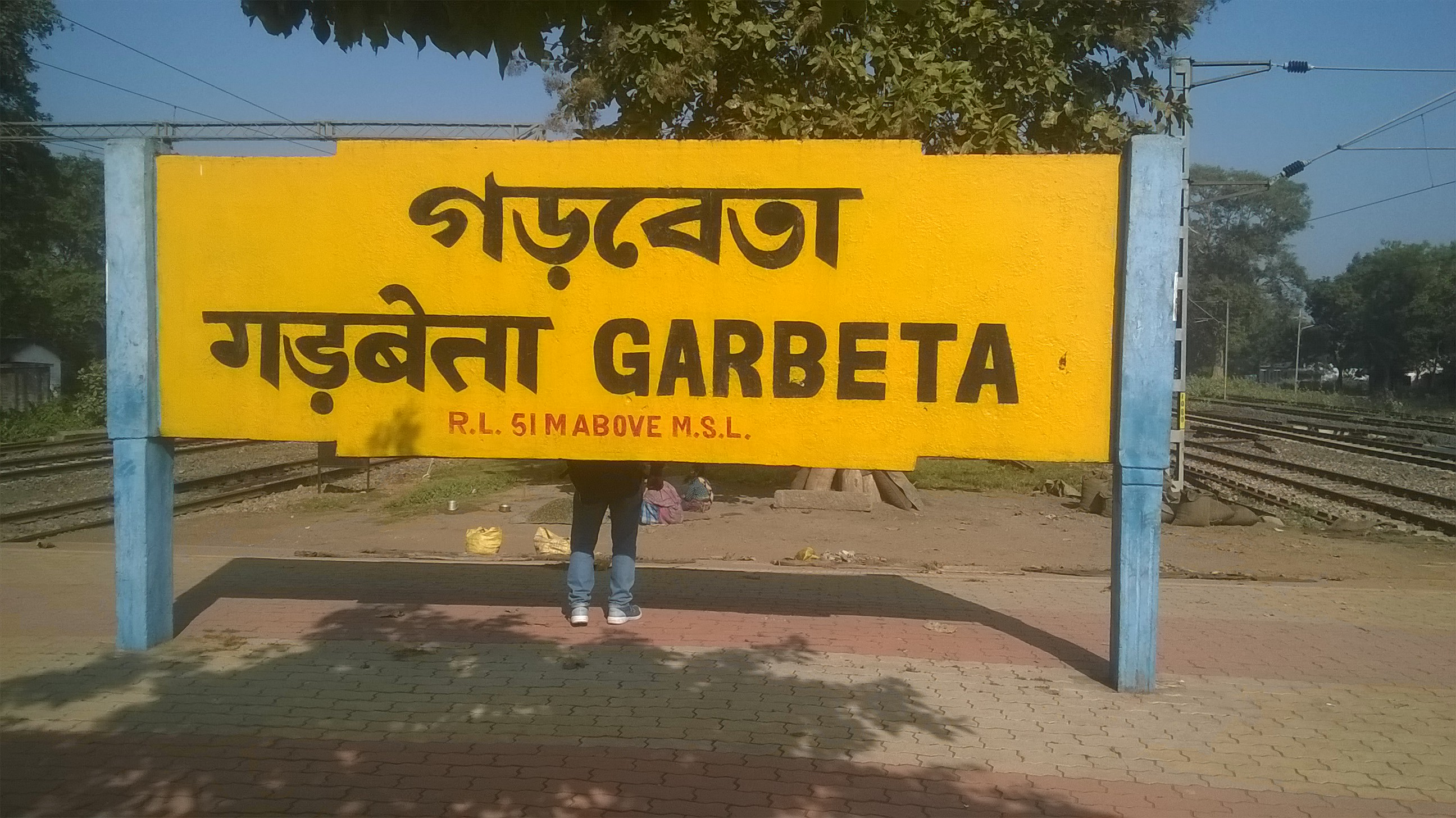
- Garbeta railway station

- Location in West Bengal, India Garhbeta (India)
- Coordinates: 22.86°N 87.36°E
- Country: India
- State: West Bengal
- District: Paschim Medinipur

Population (2011)
  - Total: 5,109

Languages
  - Official: Bengali, English, Santali
- Time zone: UTC+5:30 (IST)
- Vehicle registration: WB
- Lok Sabha constituency: Jhargram
- Vidhan Sabha constituency: Garbeta
- Website: paschimmedinipur.gov.in

Garbeta is a census town in the Garhbeta I CD block in the Medinipur Sadar subdivision of the Paschim Medinipur district in the state of West Bengal, India. It is on the bank of the Shilabati river. Gar in Bengali means a nullah. The boundary of the earlier town was surrounded by a small nullah.

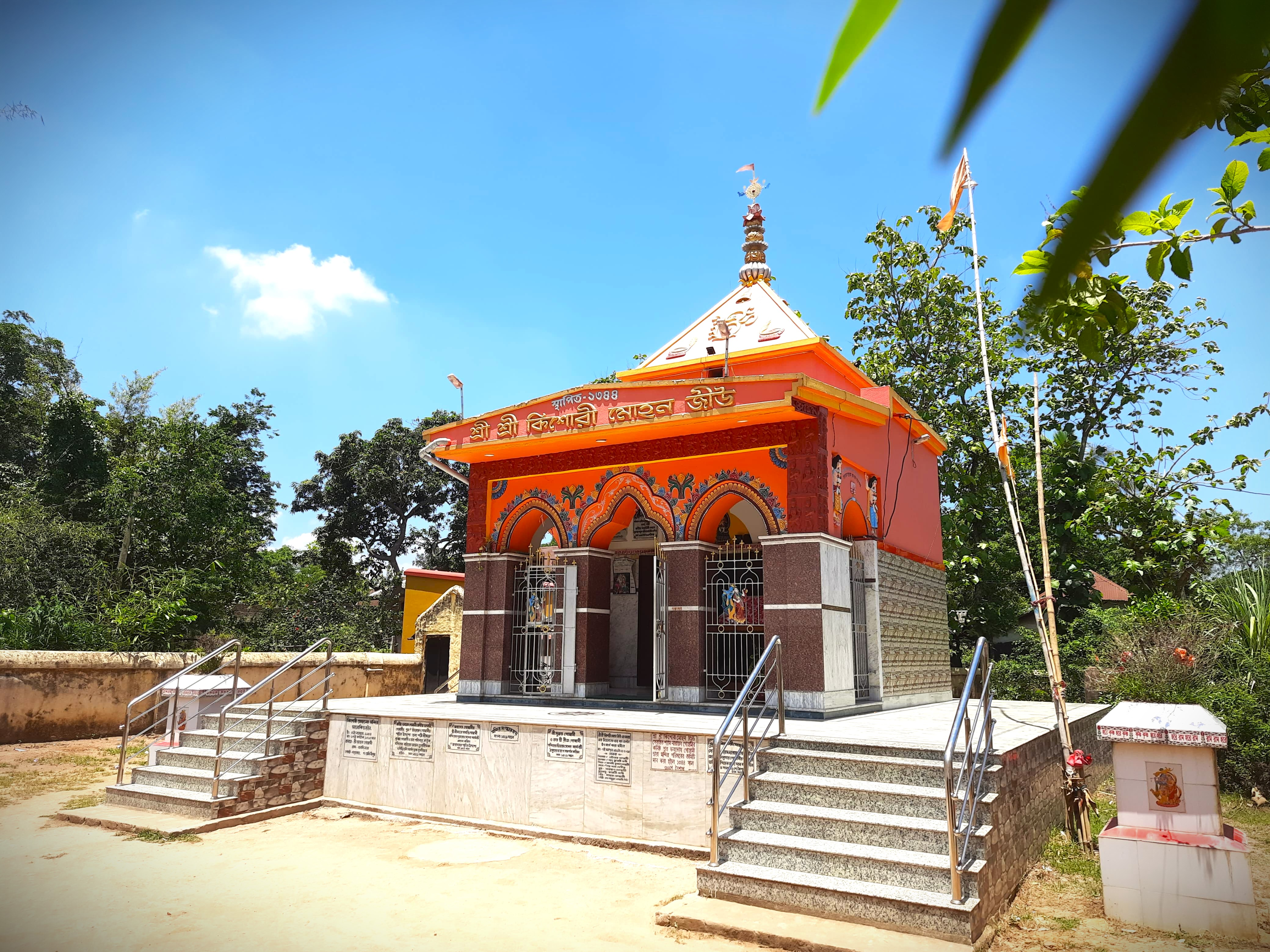
SRI SRI KISORIMOHAN JIU MANDIR

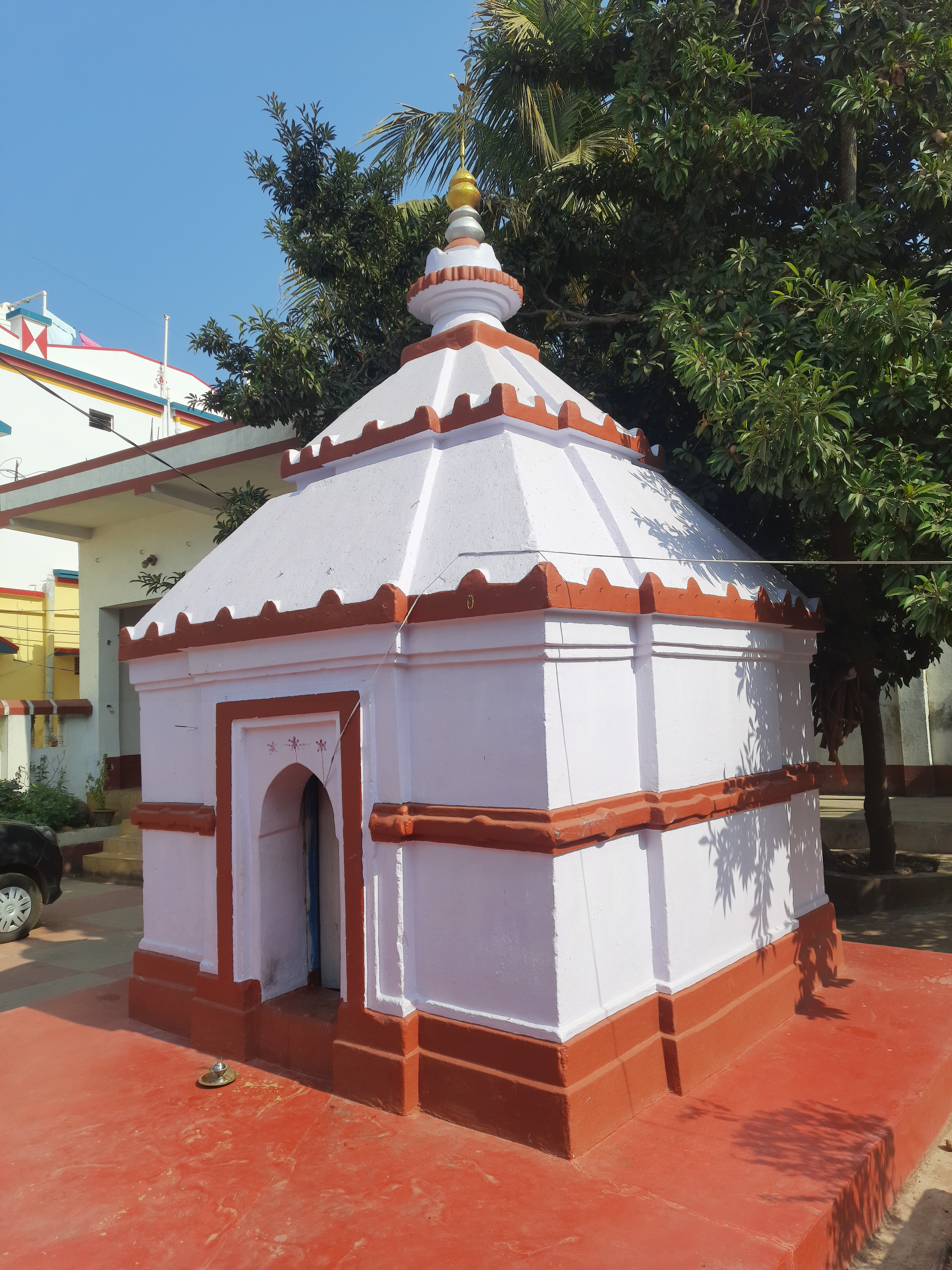
KANU THAKUR SAMADHI MANDIR

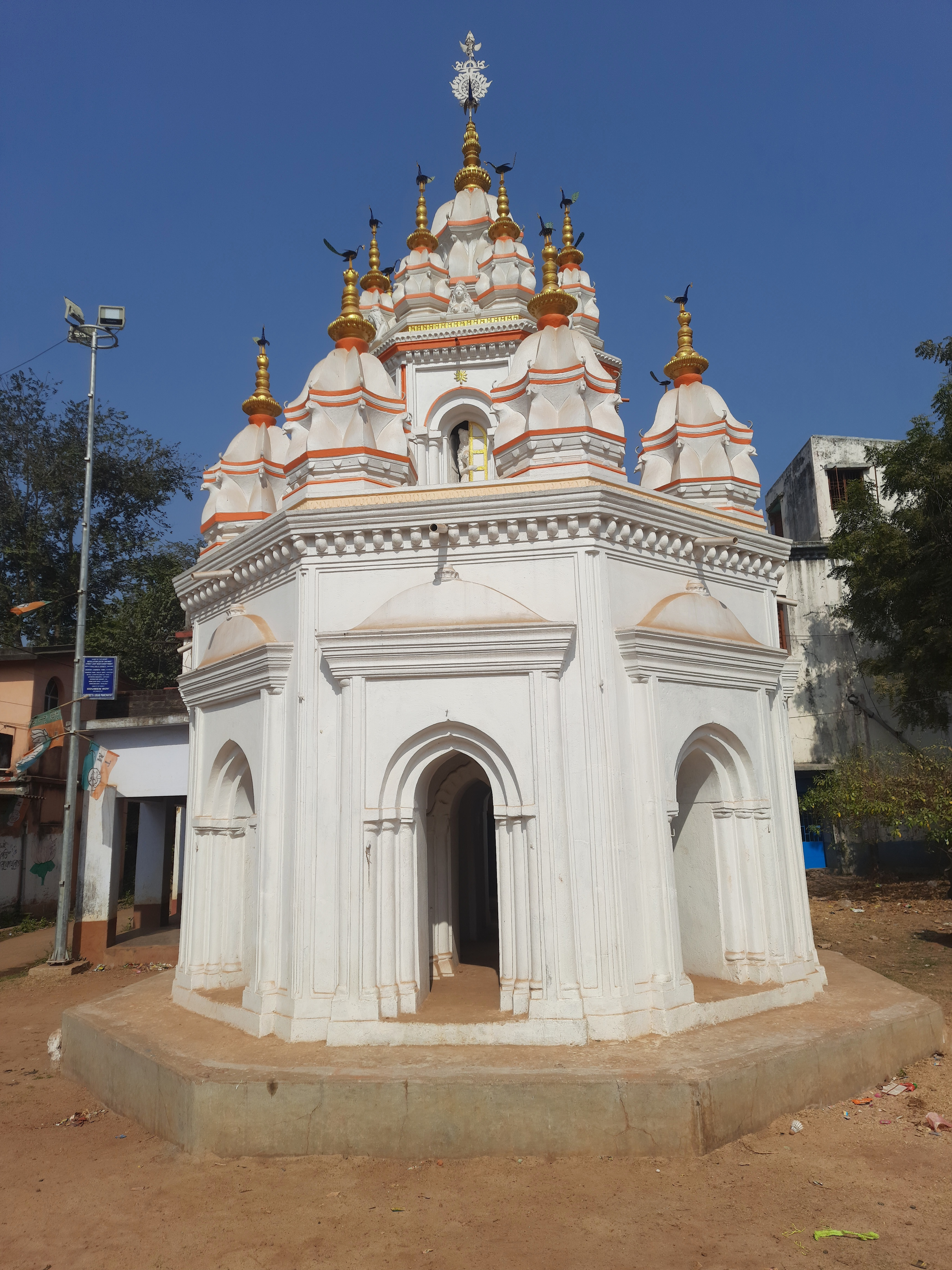
সতেরোচূড়া রাসমঞ্চ, গড়বেতা

== Geography ==
Cities and towns in Medinpur Sadar subdivision of Paschim Medinipur district
M: municipal city/ town, CT: census town, R: rural/ urban centre, H: historical/ religious centre F: facilities
Owing to space constraints in the small map, the actual locations in a larger map may vary slightly

=== Location ===
Garbeta is located at 22°52′N 87°22′E.

=== Area overview ===
Paschim Medinipur district (before separation of Jhargram) had a total forest area of 1,700 km^{2}, accounting for 14.31% of the total forested area of the state. It is obvious from the map of the Midnapore Sadar subdivision, placed alongside, that there are large stretches of forests in the subdivision. The soil is predominantly lateritic. Around 30% of the population of the district resides in this subdivision. 13.95% of the population lives in urban areas and 86.05% lives in the rural areas.

Note: The map alongside presents some of the notable locations in the subdivision. All places marked in the map are linked in the larger full screen map.

== Demographics ==
According to the 2011 Census of India Garbeta had a total population of 5,109 of which 2,576 (50%) were males and 2,533 (50%) were females. Population in the age range 0–6 years was 463. The total number of literate persons in Garbeta was 3,886 (76.06% of the population over 6 years).

== Infrastructure ==
According to the District Census Handbook 2011, Paschim Medinipur, Garbeta covered an area of 0.6071 km^{2}. Among the civic amenities, the protected water supply involved overhead tank, service reservoir, tap water from treated and untreated sources. It had 998 domestic electric connections, 50 road lighting points. Among the medical facilities it had 4 medicine shops in the town. Among the educational facilities it had were 2 primary schools, 1 secondary school, 1(?) senior secondary school, 1 general degree college.

== Civic administration ==
=== CD block HQ ===
The headquarters of Garhbeta I block are located at Garbeta.

=== Police station ===
Garbeta police station has jurisdiction over parts of Garhbeta I, Garhbeta II, and Garhbeta III CD blocks.

== Economy ==
The economy of this area is agriculturally based. The principal crops include rice, potatoes, wheat, and vegetables of different kinds. Some villagers are engaged in fishing, hawking and weaving. A small percentage of the townspeople are government employees and school teachers. Most of the people are middle class to lower middle class.

== Transportation ==
Garbeta is well connected by highways and railways with nearby cities like Midnapore, Kharagpur, Bankura, Ghatal, Howrah etc. For local transportation bus, minibus, auto rickshaws and van rickshaws are available. There is also a railway station named Garbeta railway station. Station Code is GBA.

== Education ==
There are number of well known schools in Garbeta, including Garbeta High School, Banerjee Danga High School, Saradamani Girls' High School, Garhbeta Umadevi Girls High School and Monglapota High School. The only college here is Garbeta College which is part of Vidyasagar University. There are also non-governmental educational organizations in or near Garbeta including "Raksha Bandhan For Education",

== Health ==
There is a rural hospital in Garbeta, as well as many private medical practitioners. Overall, the population is generally healthy.

== Sarva Mangala temple ==
There are a number of temples in Garbeta but particular mention has to be made of the temple of Sarva Mangala. It is peculiar in having its door facing the north. According to the tradition, during the days of Maharaja Vikramaditya of Ujjain a yogi was wandering about in the thick of the forests and was attracted to this particular place. He immediately brought about a temple of Sarva Mangala Devi through his mantras.

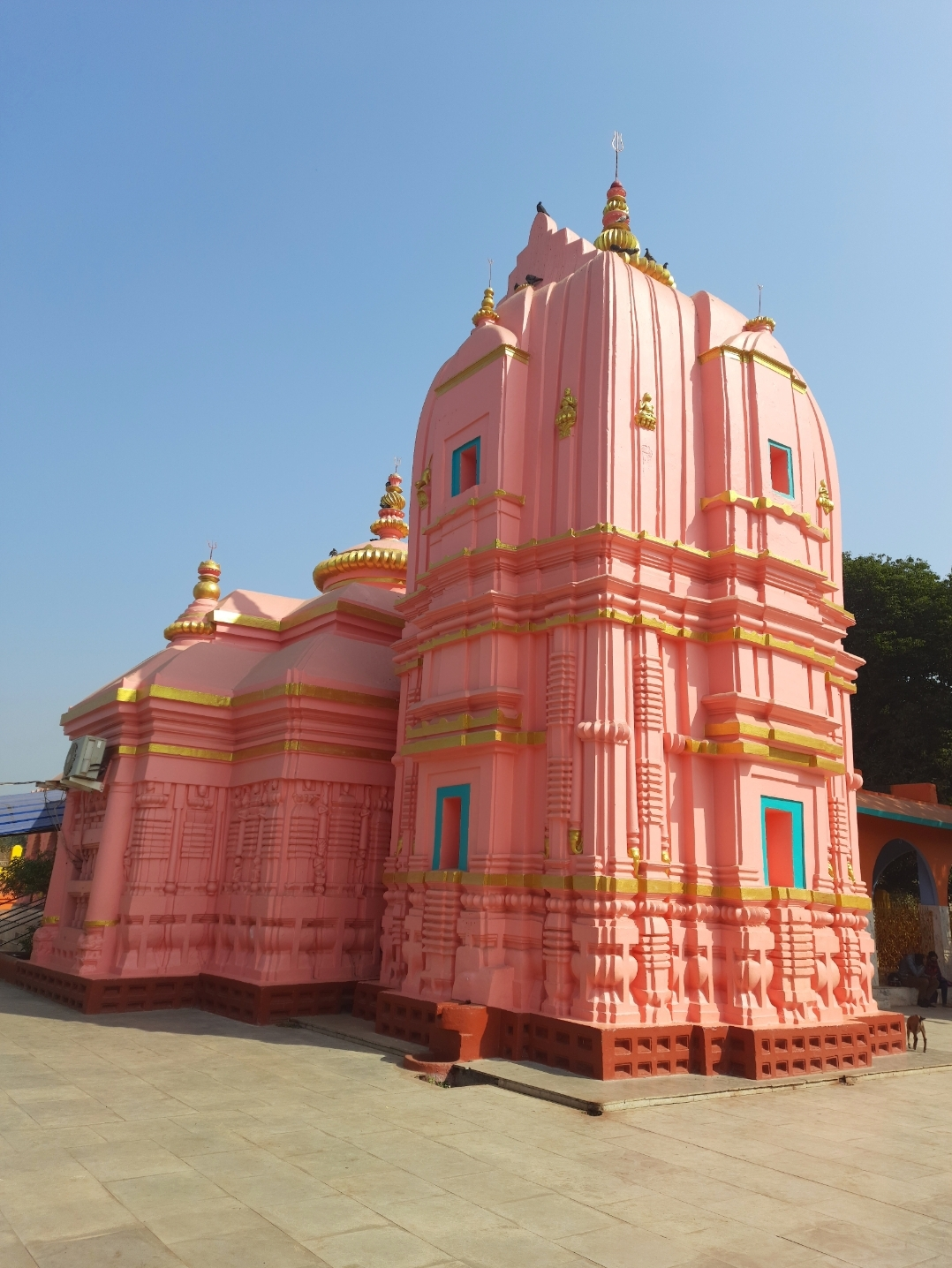
Sarbamangala Temple of Garhbeta

Maharaja Vikramaditya came to know of the dynamic force of this and came to Garbeta where he performed a tantric sadhana sitting on a dead body. The Devi was pleased with the sadhana of the Maharaja, blessed him with supernatural powers and gave him the services of Tal and Betal. The Maharaja wanted to test the spiritual power conferred on him by the Devi and asked Tal and Betal to turn the temple and make it face the north. Tal and Betal did so and it is said that the name Garbeta derives its name from Tal and Betal.

== Festivals ==
There are many festivals in Garbeta. There is one rural organization named Prayas which promotes all manner of cultural events. There are some religious sites, among which Sarbangala Mandir is most popular. The regular Bengali festivals like Durga Puja, Lakshmi Puja, Saraswati Puja and Kali Puja are well attended. Other common pujas are Shitala, Jagaddhatri, Holi and Bheema.

== Famous Tourist Spots ==
- Gongoni Danga - A natural hill on the silabati river bank which is a very popular picnic spot. It is a natural river canyon and has different spectacular types of formation due to soil erosion.
- Sarbamangala Mandir -The largest temple on the north side of Mangala lake, it shows the influence of Oriya architecture.
- Raikota Fort - Some of the most prominent architectural remains are the ruins of an old fort. At the entrance to the fort are four massive gateways which still bear their old names: Lal Darwaja, Hanuman Darwaja, Pesha Darwaja and Rauti Darwaja. Within the fort there are seven large silted up water ponds, each with a temple in the center. They all lie towards the north of the fort and it is believed that they were excavated between 1555 and 1610 A.D. in the time of the Chauhan Rajas of Bagri.
- Krishnarai Jiu Temple, Bagri - The temple is situated at the left bunk of the river Silaboti. It has five pillars and is a pure example of Bengali architecture. It was built by Rajyadhar Roy, minister for the first king of Bagri, Gajapati Singha.
- Kameshwar Temple and Radhaballav Temple - Both the temples are famous and one can see some similarity with Sarbamangala Temple . Radhaballav temple is a mixture of Oriya and Bengali architecture.
- Raghunathji Temple, Raghunath Bari - It is situated at the southern part of river Silaboti and has nine pillars. Raghunath or Bishnupur's Adi Malla made this temple.
- Sri Sri Baba Basanta Ray Jiu Temple - This shiva temple is located in Raskundu (near Garhbeta). Here medicines for rheumatism artharitis and other ailments are given.
- Uriyasaier Temple - The remains of a stone temple, made by Chouhan Singha.
- Jhalda Fort, Nayabasat - The remains of Bagri king Ganapati Singha's fort.

Gallery of Shilabati at Gongoni Danga

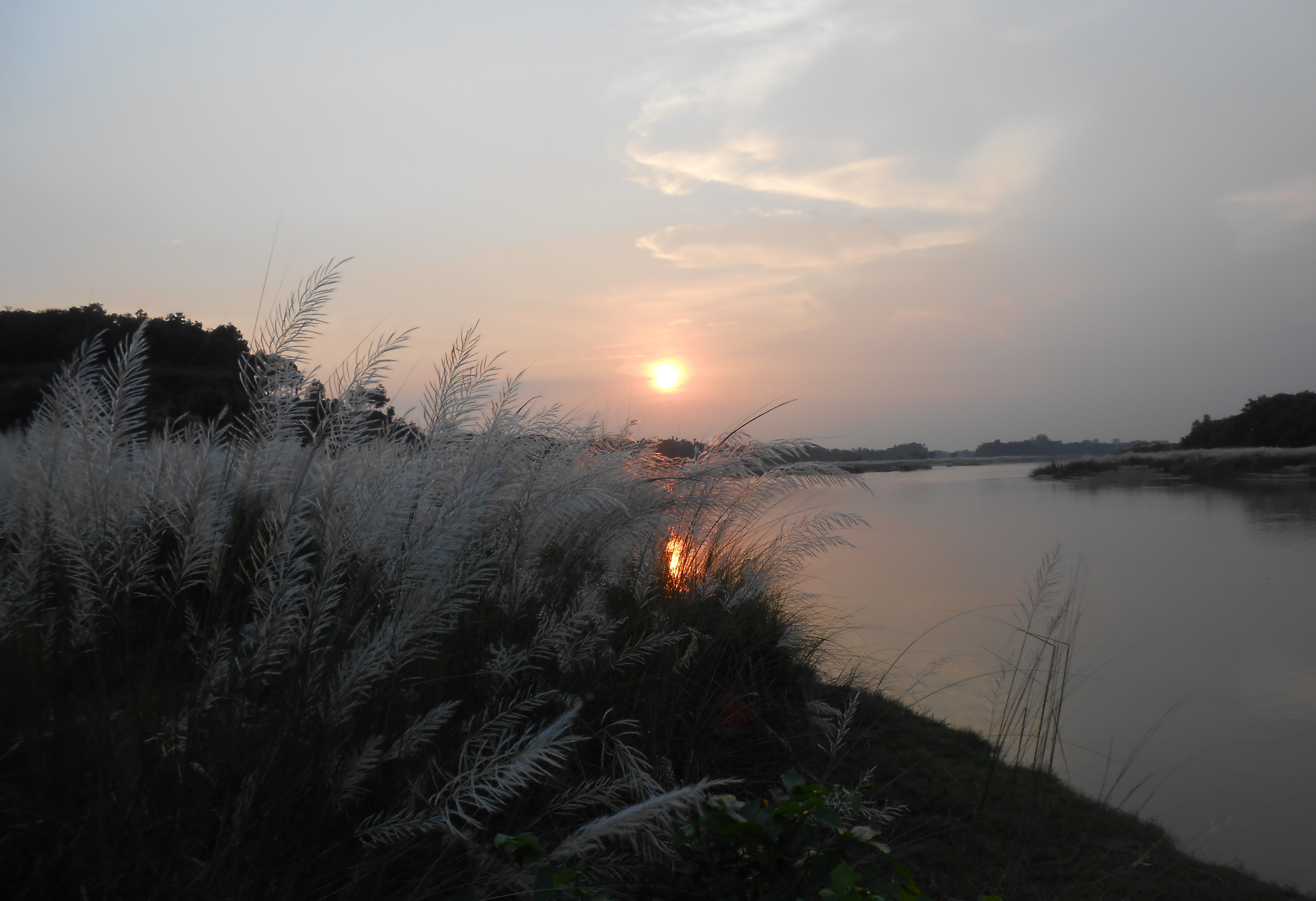
Sunset at Shilabati on a December evening

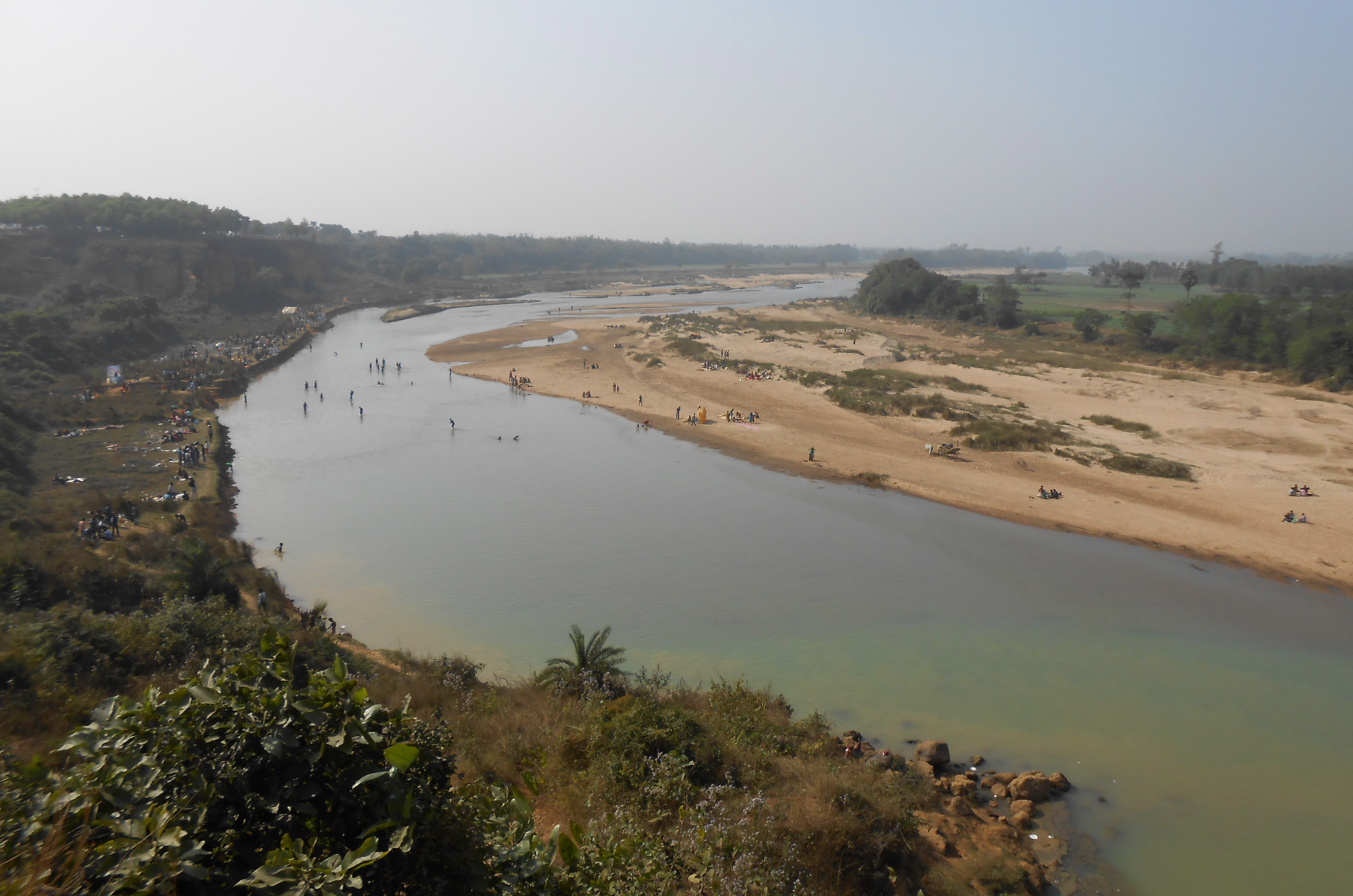
Tourists on the banks of Shilabati on New Year's Eve.

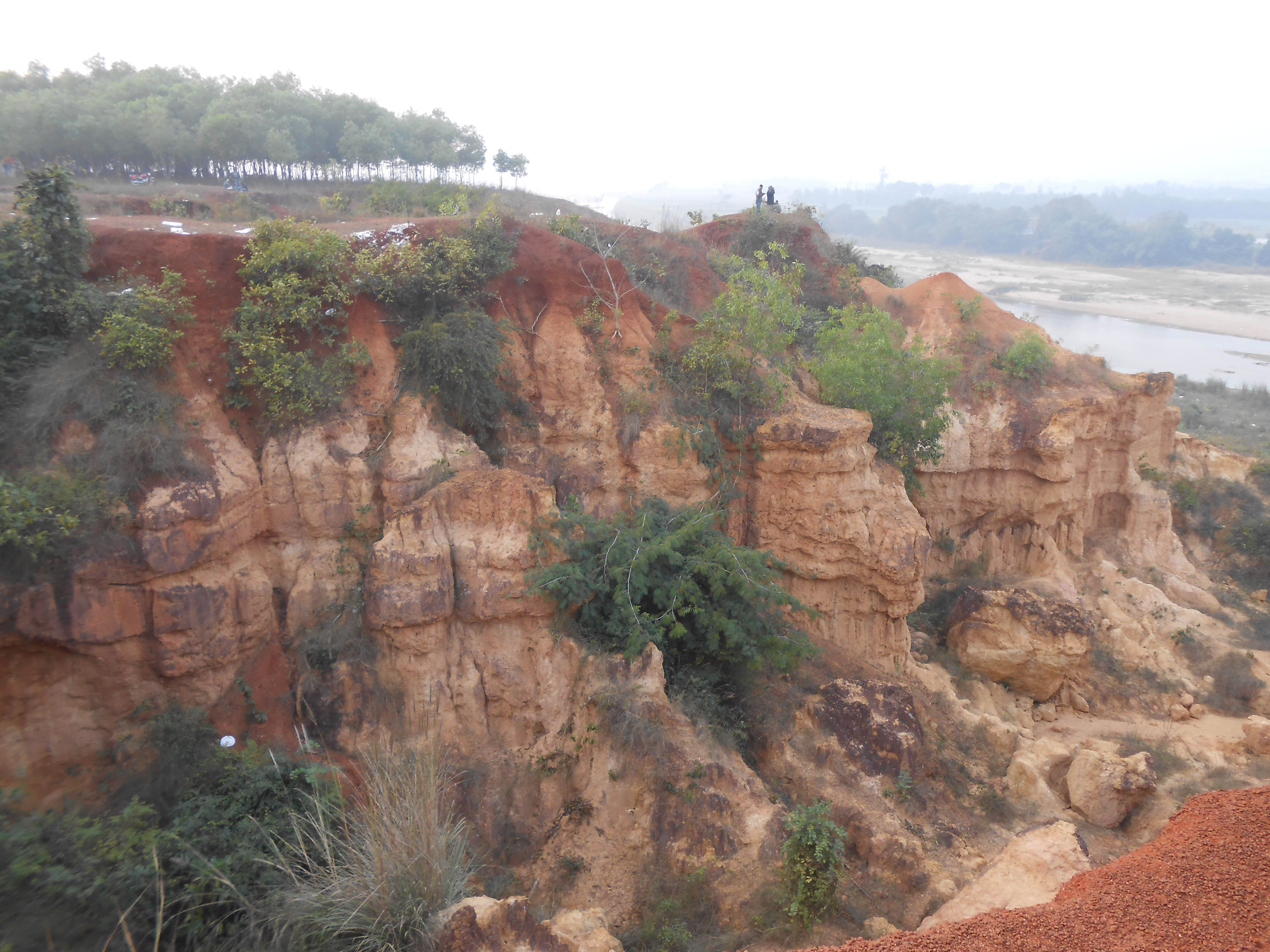
Ravines on the banks of Shilabati

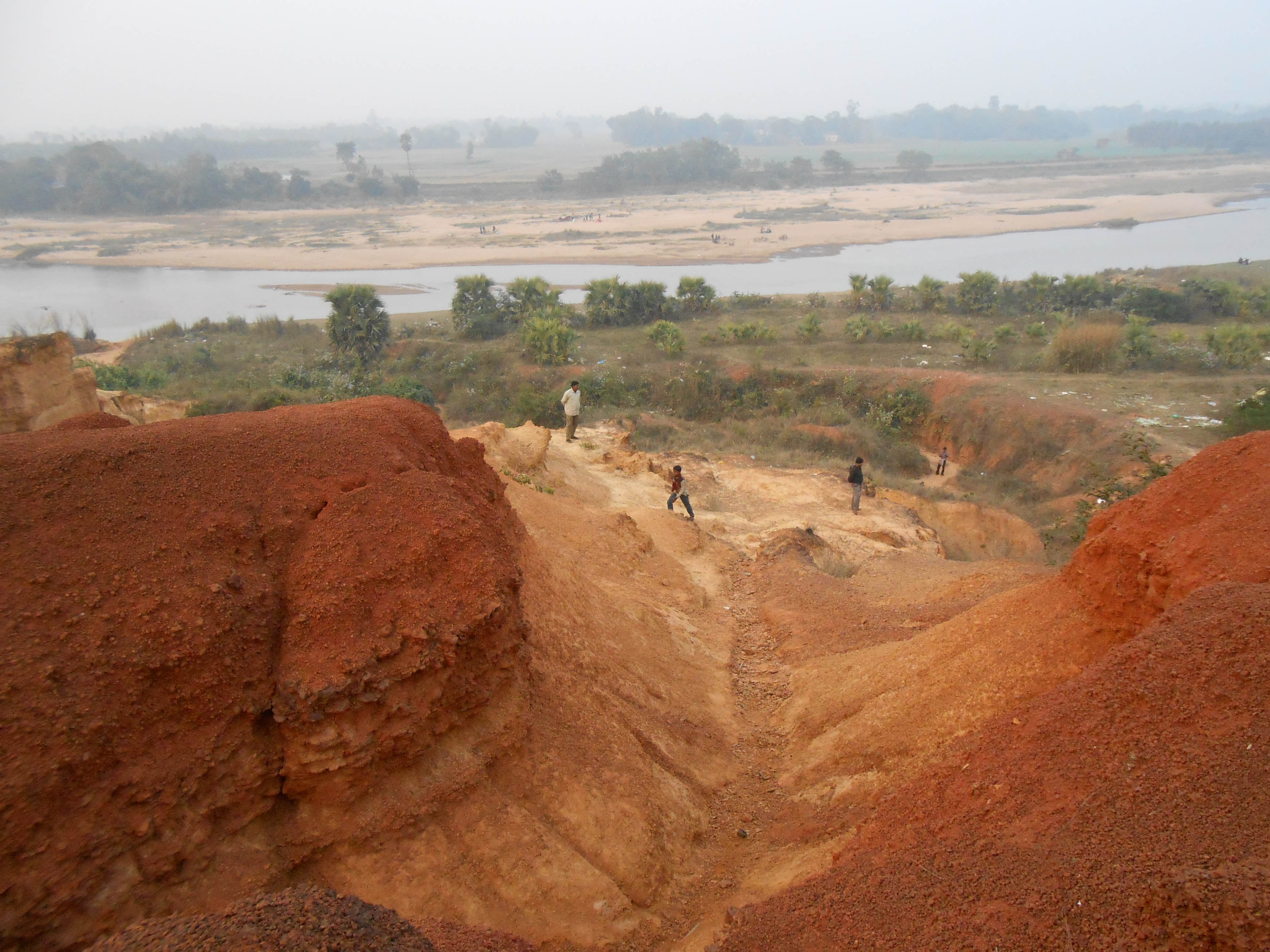
Creases on the banks of Shilabati, Gangani

== See also ==
- Shilabati
- Garhbeta College
