= USY =

USY may refer to:

- United Synagogue Youth, a Jewish youth group
- University of Sanya, a Chinese university
- USY, the Uyghur Cyrillic alphabet
- Usy, Tatarstan, a place in Russia
- Ultrastable zeolite Y, high-silica synthesized faujasite that had its aluminium removed

== See also ==
- Usie, a term for group selfies
- United States Youth Soccer Association (USYS), a youth soccer organization
