= Krishnarai Jiu Temple, Bagri =

Bagri Krishnarai Jew Temple

Religion
- Affiliation: Hinduism, Vaishnavism
- District: Paschim Medinipur
- Deity: Radha, Krishna

Location
- Location: Bagri, Garhbeta
- State: West Bengal
- Country: India

Architecture
- Established: 1412 C.E. (approx.)

Krishnarai Jew Temple, Bagri is a famous and historic Hindu temple in Bagri near Garhbeta in Paschim Medinipur district of West Bengal. The temple is dedicated to Lord Krishna and his spiritual consort, Radha Rani and is located right on the left bank of the Shilabati river. The history of the establishment of the temple goes back to the late 14th century when Mukundaram Batabyal, the Minister of Raja Gajapati Singha, the king of Bagri brought a Krishna idol from Puri and began to worship it. Raja Gajapati Singha then constructed a temple for the Lord and gave 52 acres of land to Mukundaram. After a few decades, the idol of Radha Rani was also established. The Krishna idol is made of pure black basalt rock and the Radha idol is made up of eight different metals (Ashtadhatu). Radha-Krishna Jugal Murti (Couple Statue) is worshipped according to Hindu Religion's Vishnu Purana and Garuda Purana. b This temple holds great spiritual, cultural and traditional value not only for locals but also for outsiders.

Rath Yatra and Rash Yatra are two famous festivals which is celebrated here but Dola Yatra is the most famous one. Many people gather there to see the Dola of the Lord. Apart from the original Bagri Temple, there are two more temples dedicated to the Lord - The Mayta Temple (also called Mashir Bari, the maternal aunt's house) and the Raghunathbari Temple (both built by the grandson of Raja Gajapati Singha, Raja Raghunath Singha).

Mukundaram Batabyal was given the title 'Ray' by the king, Gajapati Singha. He became renowned with his name, Rajyadhar Ray. His descendants also carry the title Ray. The administration of the temple is conducted by the Board of Trustees named the Bagri Ishwar Krishnarai Jew Devottar Trust, headed by Bikash Kumar Ray, Anil Baran Ray and Alokmoy Ray. They have stored the tradition and legacy of the Lord and the temple.

== How to reach ==
The temple is connected to Garhbeta Railway Station and also to the Garhbeta Bus Stand by roads.

- Garhbeta to Midnapore, Kharagpur, Howrah and Bankura, Puruliya by Railways (South-Eastern Railways, Adra Division)
