= Amod Kanth =

Indian police officer and social worker (born 1947)

Amod K. Kanth
- Born: 21 November 1947 (age 78); Ranchi, Jharkhand
- Education: M.S. College (B.A. History) Patna University (M.A. History) Delhi University (L.L.B)
- Known for: IPS officer; Rajiv Gandhi assassination investigation; transistor bomb blast cases; anti-Khalistani terrorism; Charles Sobhraj case; Jessica Lal murder case; Lalit Maken murder case; General A. S. Vaidya murder case; BMW hit-and-run case; 1984 Delhi anti-Sikh riots; Harshad Mehta case; Jain Hawala case; Prayas; DCPCR; Domestic Workers Sector Skill Council

Amod K. Kanth is a former Indian Police Service (IPS) officer and the founder of the NGO Prayas.

Kanth joined the IPS in 1974, serving primarily in Delhi, and attained the rank of Director General of Police (DGP) for Goa and subsequently for Arunachal Pradesh.

== Education ==
Kanth holds a B.A. in history from M.S. College, Motihari, a Master of Arts in history from Patna University, and an LL.B. from Delhi University.

== Career ==
Kanth received the President's Police Medal and a Gallantry Award for protecting civilians during the 1984 anti-Sikh riots. He was involved in multiple investigations, including those into the assassinations of Rajiv Gandhi and Lalit Maken, as well as cases related to narcotics and child abuse.

In 1988, Kanth founded Prayas, an organization established to address the welfare, education, and protection of children, youth, women and other vulnerable groups. Prayas JAC Society was established to support the welfare and rehabilitation of children in need of care and protection, as well as juveniles in conflict with the law. The organization has since expanded its work to include child development and socio-economic support programs for marginalized communities in various regions. It also supports women through self-help groups, income-generation initiatives, and entrepreneurship training.

He has contributed to policy discussions of the Indian Government and participated in youth-related initiatives of the UN, UNICEF, and the US government, as well as child and youth programs in India, Nepal, and Bangladesh.

=== Politics ===
Kanth contested the Sangam Vihar Assembly Constituency of Delhi State as an Indian National Congress candidate in November 2008. He lost the 2008 Delhi Legislative Assembly election, finishing as runner-up by 3,589 votes.

== Controversies ==
In April 2023, the Supreme Court of India revoked a summons issued to Kanth for allegedly allowing more people into the Uphaar Cinema than was permitted by the building's maximum occupancy during the Uphaar Cinema fire. The court stated this decision was not due to innocence but instead insufficient jurisdiction.

In April 2025, Kanth took legal action against the television show The Hunt: The Rajiv Gandhi Assassination Case for alleged defamation of himself and the Central Bureau of Investigation. Kanth claimed the show misrepresented and fabricated aspects of the investigation of Rajiv Gandhi's assassination to the point that it was defamatory.

From 2007 to 2011, Kanth was the chairman of the Delhi Commission for Protection of Child Rights (DCPCR). Under his leadership, DCPCR appealed against the decriminalization of homosexuality. Kanth himself issued strongly homophobic views in his arguments on behalf of DCPCR.

== Works ==
- Kanth, Amod (2021). Khaki in Dust Storm. ISBN 978-93-88630-87-0.
- Kanth, Amod K. (18 March 2023). Khaki on Broken Wings. Bloomsbury Publishing. ISBN 978-93-88912-12-9.
