= Gongoni Danga =

Canyon in Garbeta, West Bengal, India

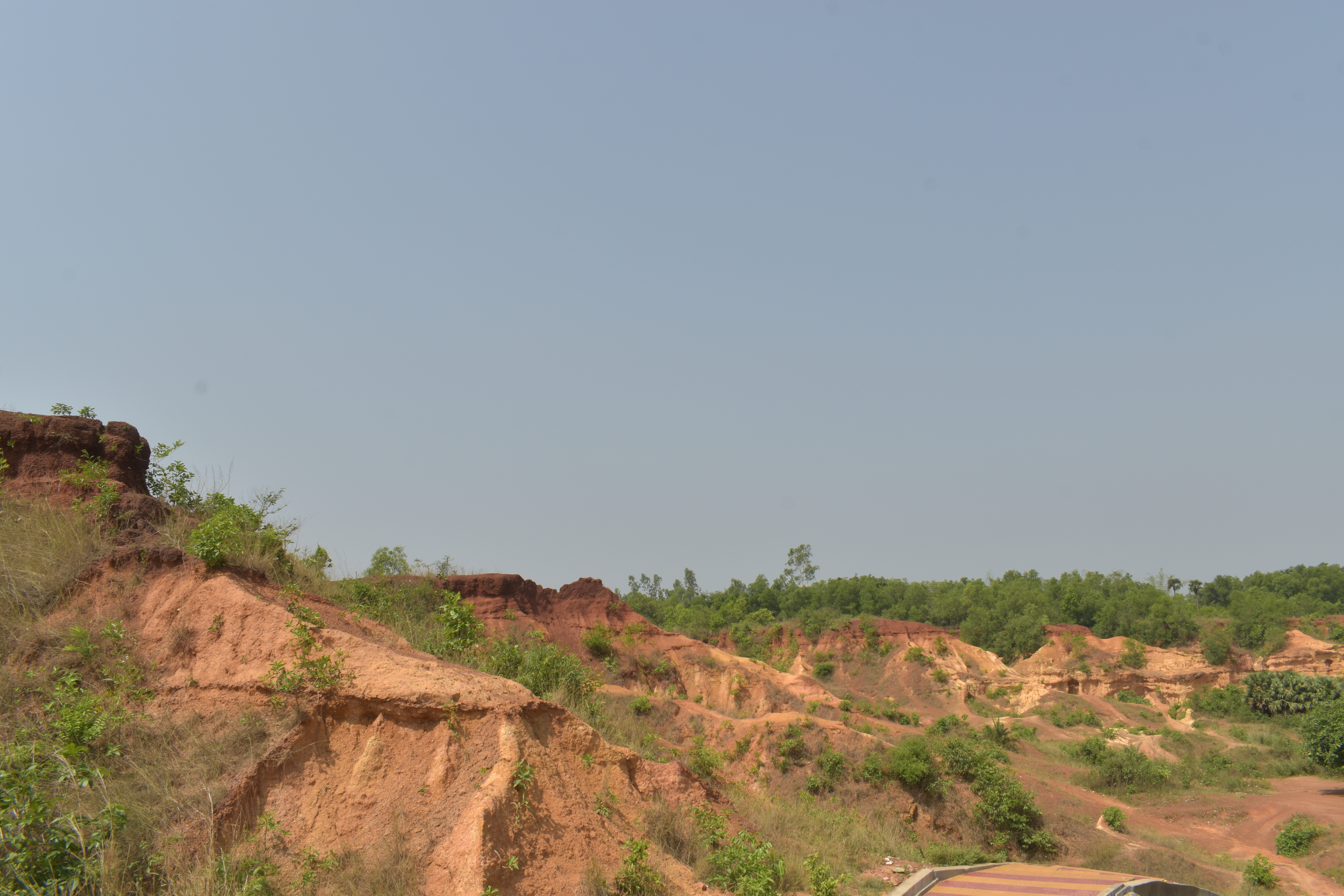
- Gangani, the Canyon created by erosion of river Silabati

- Location within West Bengal Location within India

Geography
- Location: Garbeta, Paschim Medinipur district, West Bengal, India
- Coordinates: 22.8587°N 87.3407°E
- Rivers: Shilabati River
- Interactive map of Gongoni Danga

Gongoni Danga (also spelled Gangani Danga), often referred as Grand Canyon of Bengal] is a natural canyon situated near the town of Garbeta, in the Paschim Medinipur district of West Bengal, India.

== Science ==
Cities and towns in Medinpur Sadar subdivision of Paschim Medinipur district
M: municipal city/ town, CT: census town, R: rural/ urban centre, H: historical/ religious centre, F: facilities
Owing to space constraints in the small map, the actual locations in a larger map may vary slightly

=== Location ===
Gongoni Danga is located at 22.8587°N 87.3407°E.

=== Area overview ===
Paschim Medinipur district (before separation of Jhargram) had a total forest area of 1,700 km^{2}, accounting for 14.31% of the total forested area of the state. It is obvious from the map of the Midnapore Sadar subdivision, placed alongside, is that there are large stretches of forests in the subdivision. The soil is predominantly lateritic. Around 30% of the population of the district resides in this subdivision. 13.95% of the population lives in urban areas and 86.05% lives in the rural areas.

Note: The map alongside presents some of the notable locations in the subdivision. All places marked in the map are linked in the larger full screen map.

=== Entry point ===
As one enters the area, there is red rocky land that leads to a sharp drop to the Shilabati valley or "canyon floor". One can view the splendour of the laterite cliffs floating above. “Wind and water have collaborated over millions of years to carve and chisel a craggy ravine-filled landscape of forbidding splendour.” Locals call it Gongoni Danga or Gongoni Khola. The more imaginative city folk have christened it as the Grand Canyon of West Bengal.

The local municipality has developed steps for visitors to go down through the gorge, several stories deep, the river has carved out over the years. As one descends the colours change to various hues of yellow. In the dry season, there is not much water in the river, but as the rains come, the river occupies many of the deeper parts of the canyon alleys. As one gets deep into the canyon, one gets a feeling of actual shapes and sizes of imaginary things. Some piece looks like a lion, another has look of a pagoda. There is a large cave with an interesting story.

== Mythology ==
According to local folklore, the Pandavas, the central characters of the Indian epic Mahabharata, arrived at this place during their period of exile. The five brothers came with their mother Kunti. The land was terrorized by a demon named Bakasura. The fearsome demon demanded a person from nearby villages volunteer every day for his daily requirement of meat. The Pandavas were staying with a Brahmin family, and it was the turn of the latter to meet the demon’s demand. At Kunti’s behest, Bhima agreed to go. A fierce battle, lasting for several days, started and in the end the legendary hero killed the demon. The village folk believe, “And that earth-rattling battle left the land all wrinkled and crumpled,” and that, according to some of them, was how Gangani Danga was formed.

== Rebel stronghold ==
According to Binoy Ghosh, when the Chuar rebellion started towards the end of the 18th century, the kings of Bagri were involved with the rebels, along with others like the Raja Jagannath Singh of Ghatshila and Rani Shiromani of Karnagarh. They were almost independent feudatory rulers in these areas until the British East India Company annexed the region in the 18th century. Those who served under the kings did so on a hereditary basis. When the East India Company attempted to force them to collect taxes on the EIC's behalf, they revolted. It was a mass-revolt of enormous proportions. Ganagani Danga was their stronghold. The commander of the Bagri kings, Achal Singh, was the chief. The well-known Bagdi sardar, Gobardhan Dikpati, was his assistant. However, the rebellion was eventually suppressed by the Company military by 1807. In the early years of the 20th century, an author from Chandrakona published a novel, Salphool about the events rebellion.

== Tourism ==
As a consequence of its scenery, the area has become a popular tourist destination. The canyon-like formations also attract tourists.

Gallery of Shilabati at Gongoni Danga

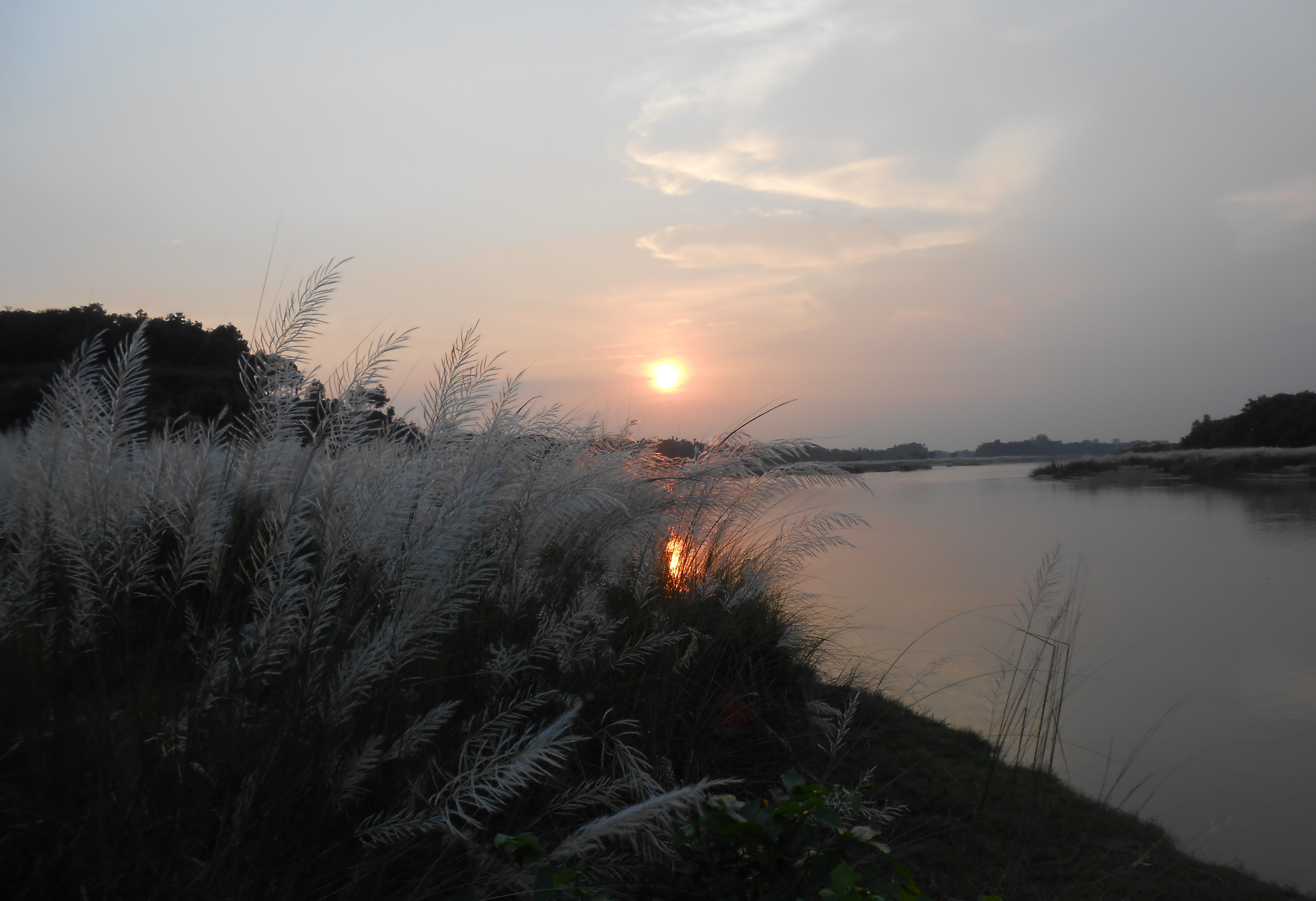
Sunset at Shilabati on a December evening

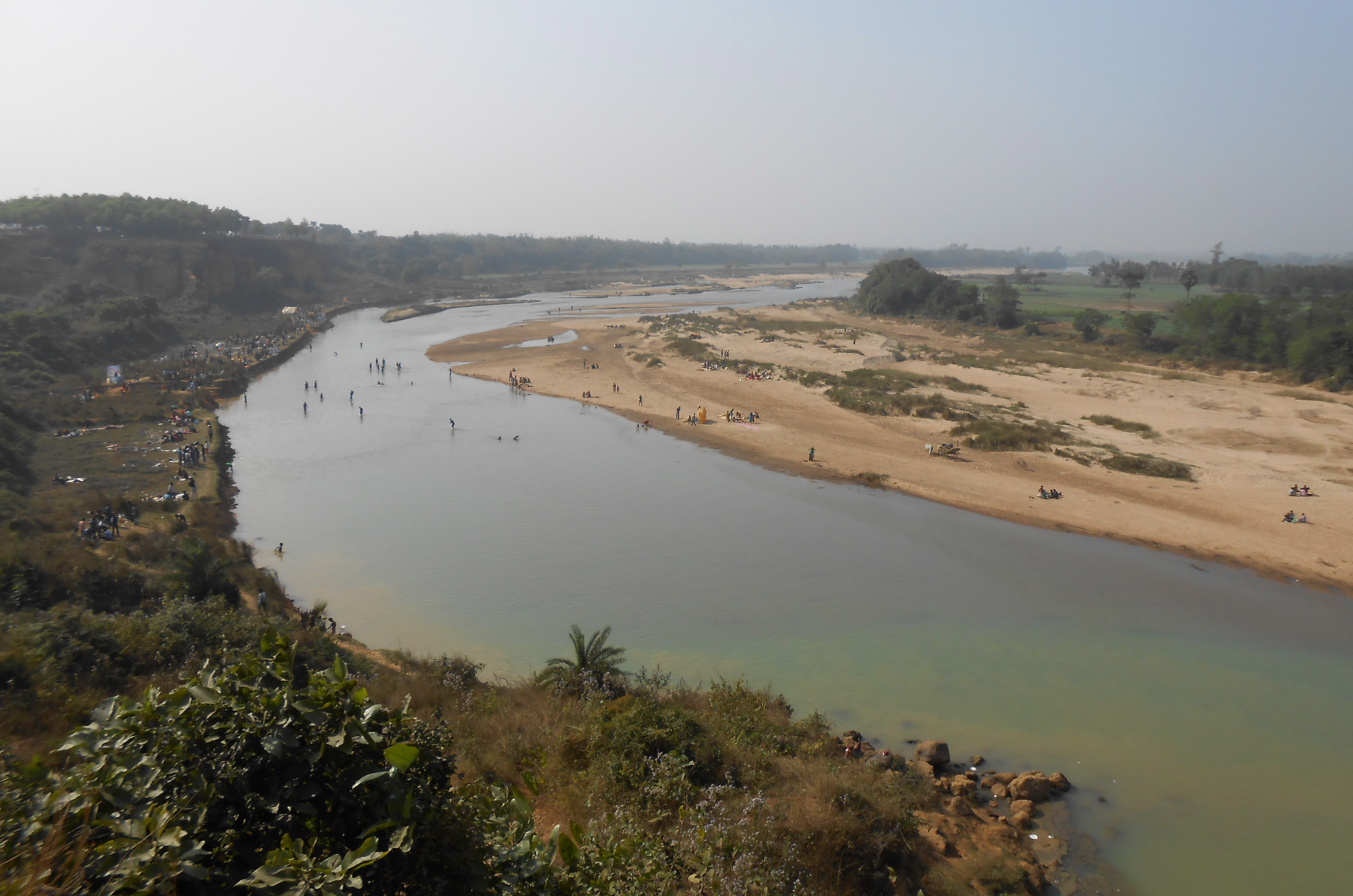
Tourists on the banks of Shilabati on New Year's Eve.

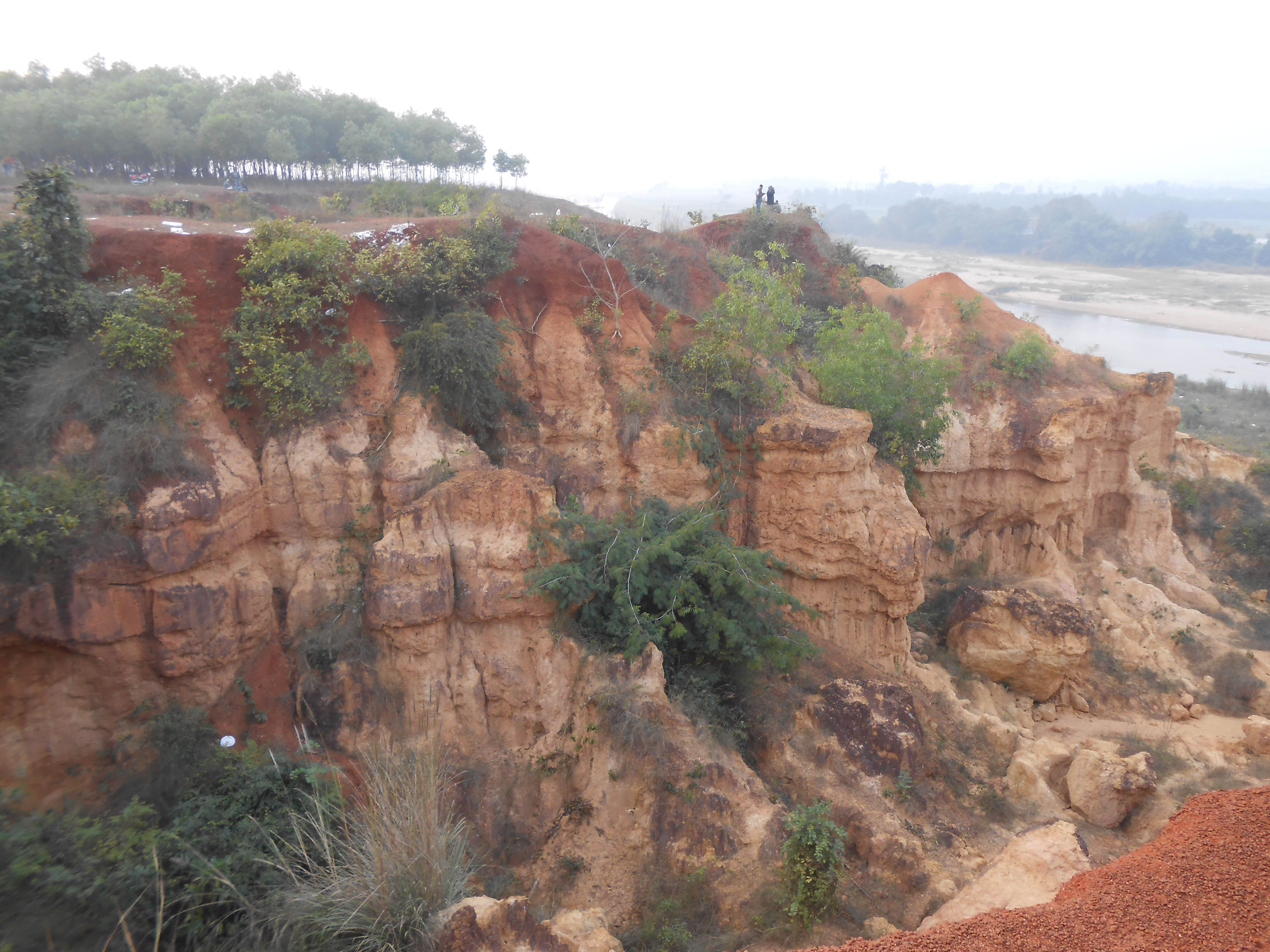
Ravines on the banks of Shilabati

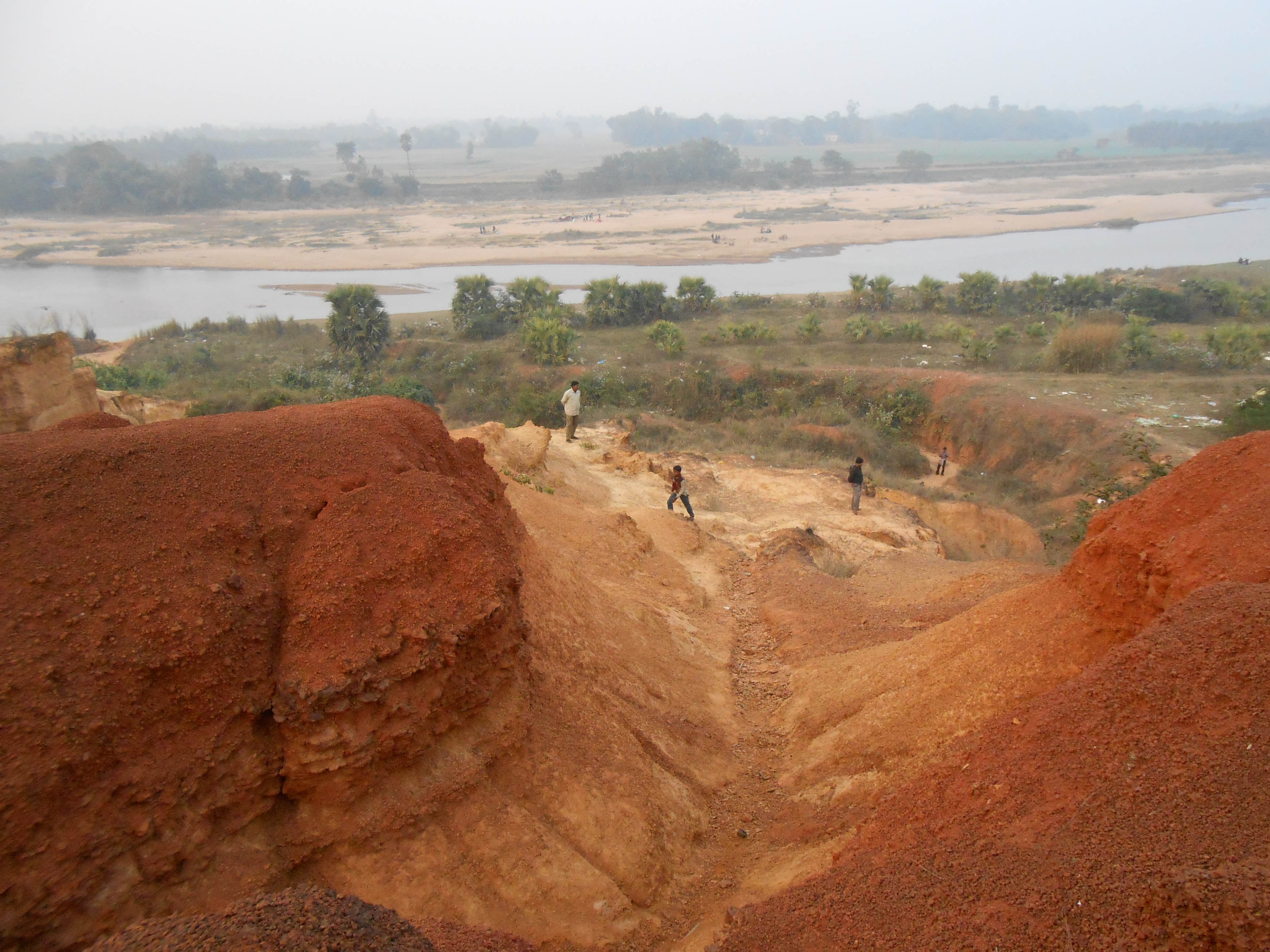
Creases on the banks of Shilabati, Gangani

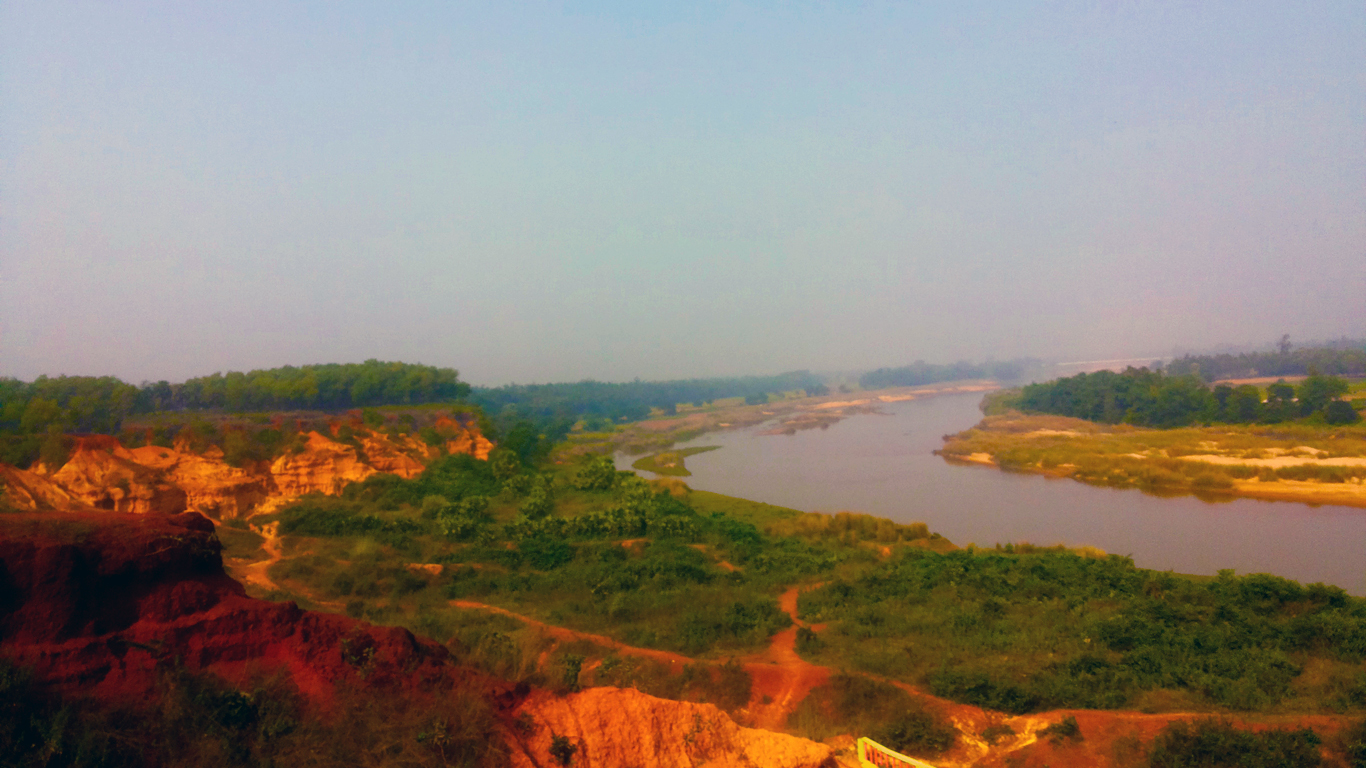
