= Usi (food) =

Nigerian delicacy

Usi, also referred to as starch, is a starch dish of the Urhobo Isoko and Edo people of Nigeria. The starch is derived from cassava (manioca) and is characterized by its yellow color and its thick, stretchy, and jelly-like texture. It pairs well with dishes like Banga Soup, Ogbono Soup, Okra Soup, and Egusi Soup.

== Ingredients ==
- 1 cup of starch
- 1/2 cup of water at room temperature
- 1 and half teaspoon of palm oil
