= Usı =

Usı Усы
- selo
- Location within Tatarstan
- Country: Russia
- Region: Tatarstan
- District: Aqtanış District
- Time zone: UTC+3:00

Usı (Tatar: Усы, romanized: Usı) is a rural locality (a selo) in Aqtanış District, Tatarstan. The population was 308 as of 2010. Usı is located 40 km from Aqtanış, district's administrative centre, and 330 km from Qazan, republic's capital, by road. The village was established in 1755. There are 3 streets in the village.
