= Prayas =

Indian non-governmental organization

Prayas JAC Society is a Non-governmental organization based in Delhi, India. It was founded in June 1988 by ex-Delhi DCP Amod Kanth after a fire destroyed makeshift homes and ragged shelters built by children in the slums of Jahangirpuri in Delhi. Amod K Kanth, former Director General of Police(DGP) of Arunachal Pradesh cadre and DCP for Crime in Delhi, was posted in Delhi when the fire broke out and he visited the site of the fire as part of his duty and was concerned on welfare of children and this prompted the birth of Prayas in a one-room in Jahangirpuri with the help of friends from the Delhi Police and the Delhi School of Social Work in a small way.

== Recognition ==
The charity received international recognition for anti-trafficking initiatives by the 2006 Trafficking in Persons Report published by the US Department of State. Amod Kanth, the head of Delhi Police and founder of Prayas, was commended as an international "model of public service" for his efforts on behalf of India's children. Prayas has responded to the earthquake of Gujarat in January 2001, the tsunami in Andaman and Nicobar Islands in 2004, the floods in Bihar the earthquake in India and Nepal in 2016, and the COVID-19 pandemic as of 2022. The organization also runs 24×7 Childline 1098 which is functional at six locations of New Delhi Railway Station, Janhagirpuri, Bawana (Delhi), Raxaul and Samastipur (Bihar) and Andaman and Nicobar Islands to support the distressed children along with their families during the COVID-19 pandemic and lockdown. In 2021, the organisation had partnered with an agency of the Rajasthan government to train 100 beggars who had been selected for various vocational training and skill jobs. The programme is a public–private partnership conducted in association with Dr Niraj K Pawan, Principal Secretary of Labour, Skilling and Rehabilitation, and is planned for entire state of Rajasthan to make the state "BhikhariMukt" or "beggar free".

In 2000, the organisation had launched the Rape Crisis Intervention Centre, presently known as One-Stop Crisis Centre, to help the victims of sexual assault, particularly minor girls, in the presence of then Minister of State for Social Justice Maneka Gandhi and Delhi Chief Minister Sahib Singh Verma. The organisation is also involved in introducing large number of other programmes in collaboration with the government and private institutions which include the Jan Shikshan Sansthan under the Ministry of Skill Development and Entrepreneurship since 2000, DUSIB, Asian Foundation, Freedom Fund, Adoption Centrum, NSDC, Coca-Cola, National Scheduled Caste Financial Development Corporation, National Backward Class Financial Development Corporation, Schneider Electric India Foundation Ltd, BC Jindal Electrician and Plumbing Training Programme and the Tata Power Delhi Development (TPDDL) project and also partnering with various government agencies and making efforts in the formulation of policies, strategies and played a role in the formulation of the Tenth Plan and the re-enactment and implementation of Juvenile Justice (Care and Protection of Children) Act, 2000, National Policy and Charter for Children and National Commission for Protection of Children Rights.

== Collaborations ==
Prayas has collaborated with the Rotaract Club of DTU Regency to organize visits from their members. In these visits, the members teach the children at Prayas. Further, additional morally sound life advice and tips are given to them.
