= Shilabati River =

River in India

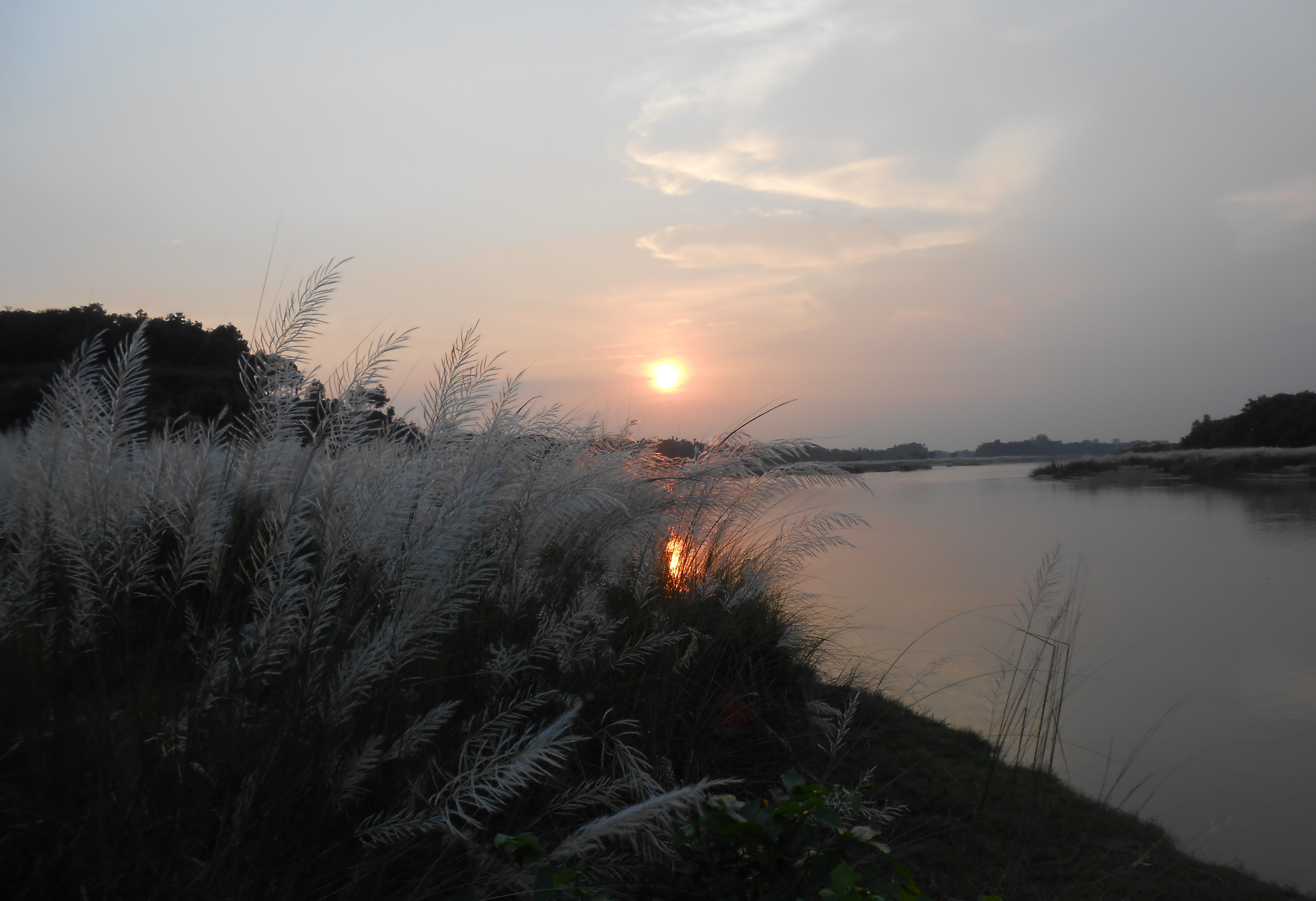
- Sunset on the Shilabati in December

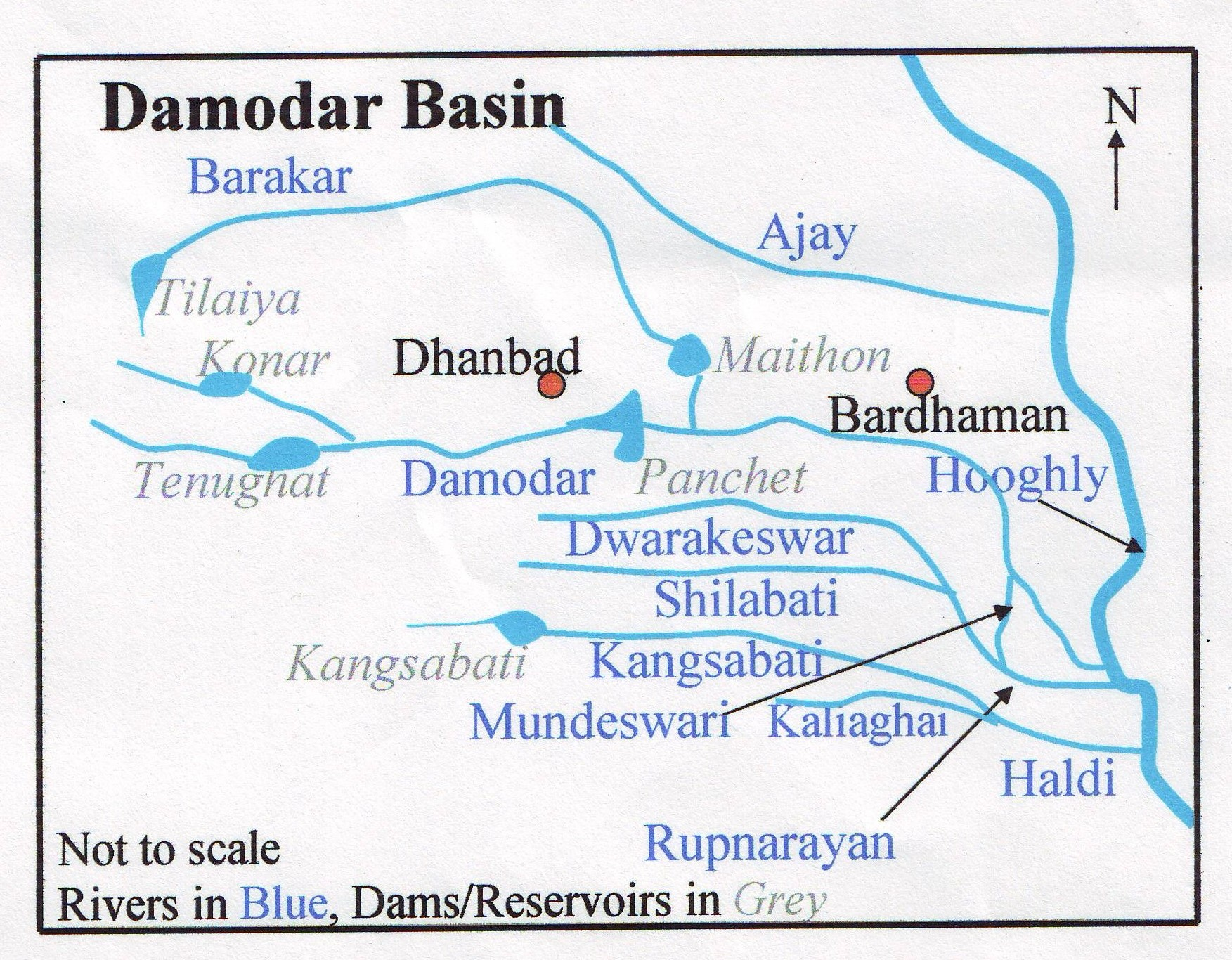

Location
- Country: India
- State: West Bengal
- City: Purulia

Physical characteristics
- Source
  - location: Near Chak Gopalpur, Hura Block, Purulia District
  - coordinates: 23°14′11″N 86°38′41″E
- Mouth
  - location: Rupnarayan River
  - coordinates: 22°40′17″N 87°46′41″E

Basin features
- Tributaries
  - left: Jaipanda River near Amlasuli

Shilabati River (also known as Shilai) originates near Chak Gopalpur village of Hura block in the Purulia district of the Indian state of West Bengal. It flows in an almost southeasterly direction through the districts of Bankura and Paschim Medinipur. The Shilabati joins the Dwarakeswar from the right near Ghatal and afterwards is known as Rupnarayan. It finally joins the Hooghly River, which empties into the Bay of Bengal.

== Course ==
The Shilabati originates near Chak Gopalpur village of Hura block in the Purulia district of the state of West Bengal.

== Others ==
At source location of Shilabati river, a temple named Maa Shilabati Temple is located. Almost every year, the Shilabati causes flooding, particularly in Banka, Khirpai and Ghatal areas. There is a small reservoir on the Shilabati near Khatra known as Kadam Dewli Dam where a canal from Mukutmanipur Kangsabati dam meets. Simlapal block town of Bankura district is located on the bank of this river. Every year, a famous Hindu religious fair called 'Ganga Mela of Simlapal' is held at the river front of Simlapal.

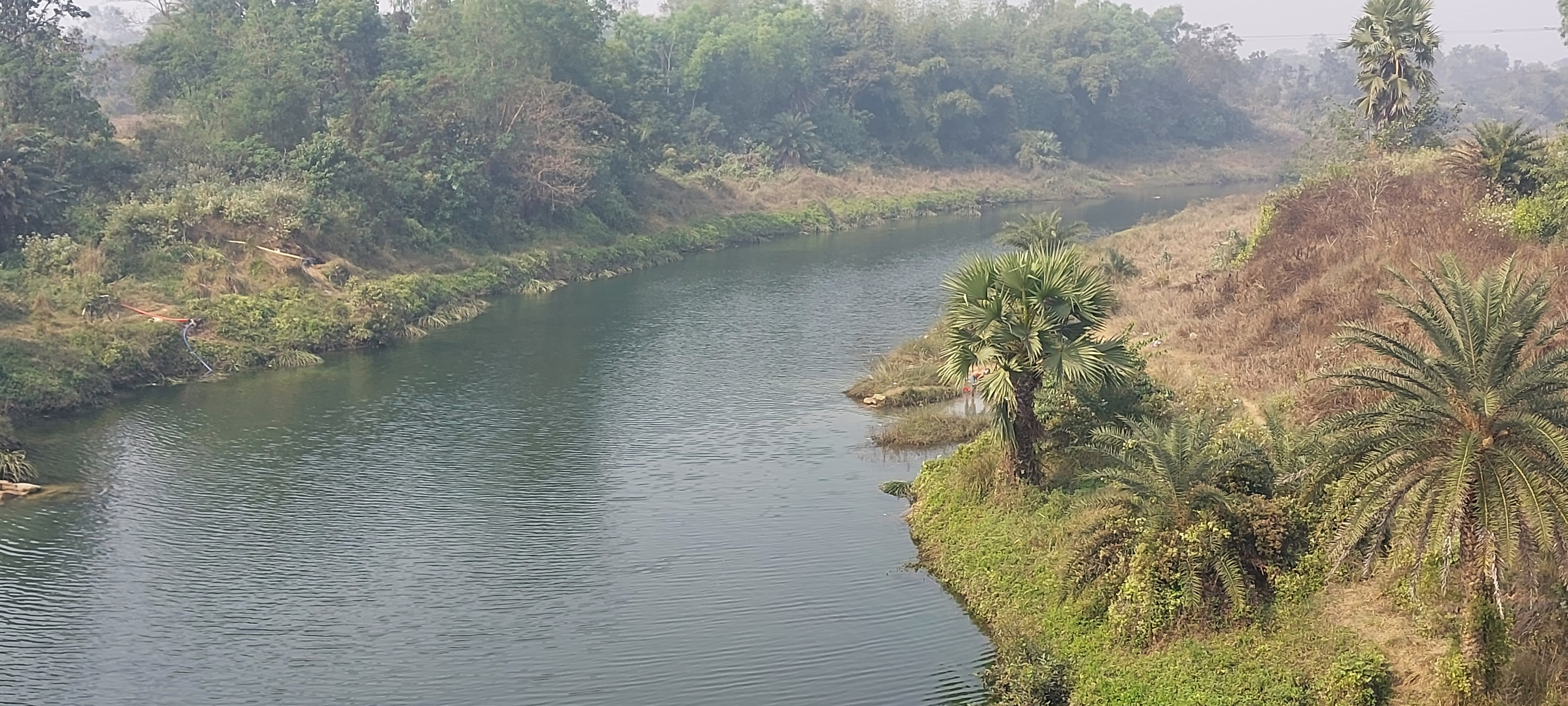
Shilabati River at Gobindapur, Bankura

Gongoni Danga, a tourist spot on the bank of the Shilabati is located in Paschim Medinipur District.

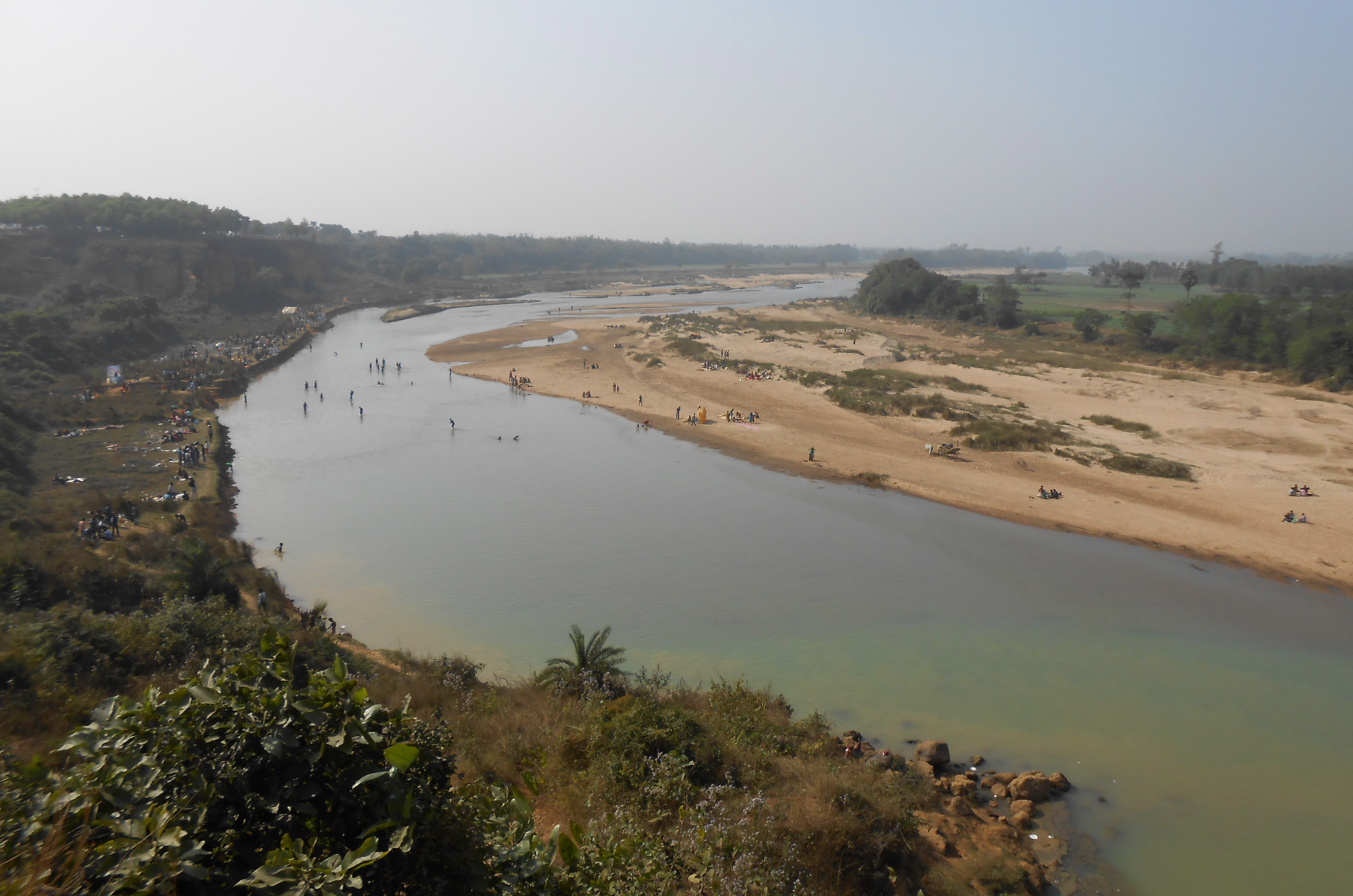
Tourists on the banks of Silabati on New Year's Eve at Gongoni Danga
