= Union Solidarity International =

USi
- Union Solidarity International
- Founded: 2010
- Headquarters: Manchester, England; Glasgow, Scotland
- Location: United Kingdom
- Key people: Geoffrey Shears; Keith Sonnet; Dave Spooner; Walton Pantland
- Website: usilive.org

Union Solidarity International (USI) was a UK-based organisation using new media to support international trade union solidarity campaigns. It is supported by Unite, the GMB, the RMT, the GFTU and a number of other UK, Irish and international unions.

Inspired by the Arab Spring, as well as effective use of social media by the Occupy movement, the organisation uses technology to build member to member solidarity. USi also provides training for trade union activists on using new media for campaigning.

The organisation shares a director with the Global Labour Institute, and has a close relationship with the GLI network.

As of 2014, USI was running a campaign to assist labourers in the brick manufacturing industry in Andhra Pradesh.
