= Jalshara =

Jalsara
- Village
- Location in West Bengal, India Jalsara (India)
- Coordinates: 22.681634°N 87.664091°E
- Country: India
- State: West Bengal
- District: Paschim Medinipur

Population (2011)
  - Total: 2,183

Languages
  - Official: Bengali, English
- Time zone: UTC+5:30 (IST)
- PIN: 721212
- Telephone/STD code: 03225
- Lok Sabha constituency: Ghatal
- Vidhan Sabha constituency: Ghatal
- Website: paschimmedinipur.gov.in

Jalsara is a village in the Ghatal CD block in the Ghatal subdivision of the Paschim Medinipur district in the state of West Bengal, India.

== Geography ==
Cities and towns in Ghatal subdivision of Paschim Medinipur district
M: municipal city/ town, R: rural/ urban centre, H: historical/ religious centre
Owing to space constraints in the small map, the actual locations in a larger map may vary slightly

=== Area overview ===
Ishwar Chandra Vidyasagar, scholar, social reformer and a key figure of the Bengal Renaissance, was born at Birsingha on 26 September 1820.

Ghatal subdivision, shown in the map alongside, has alluvial soils. Around 85% of the total cultivated area is cropped more than once. It has a density of population of 1,099 per km^{2}, but being a small subdivision only a little over a fifth of the people in the district reside in this subdivision. 14.33% of the population lives in urban areas and 86.67% lives in the rural areas.

Note: The map alongside presents some of the notable locations in the subdivision. All places marked in the map are linked in the larger full screen map.

== Demographics ==
According to the 2011 Census of India, Jalsara had a total population of 2,183, of which 1,118 (51%) were males and 1,065 (49%) were females. There were 252 persons in the age range of 0–6 years. The total number of literate persons in Jalshhara was 1,378 (71.36% of the population over 6 years).

== Education ==
Jalsara R.K.High School is a Bengali-medium coeducational institution established in 1960. The school has facilities for teaching from class V to class XII. It has a library with 135 books, 9 computers and a playground.

== Culture ==
David J. McCutchion mentions the Siva temple at Jalsara as a high-towered baro-chala with ratha projections. It is largely plain and measures 13’ square.

== Jalsara picture gallery ==
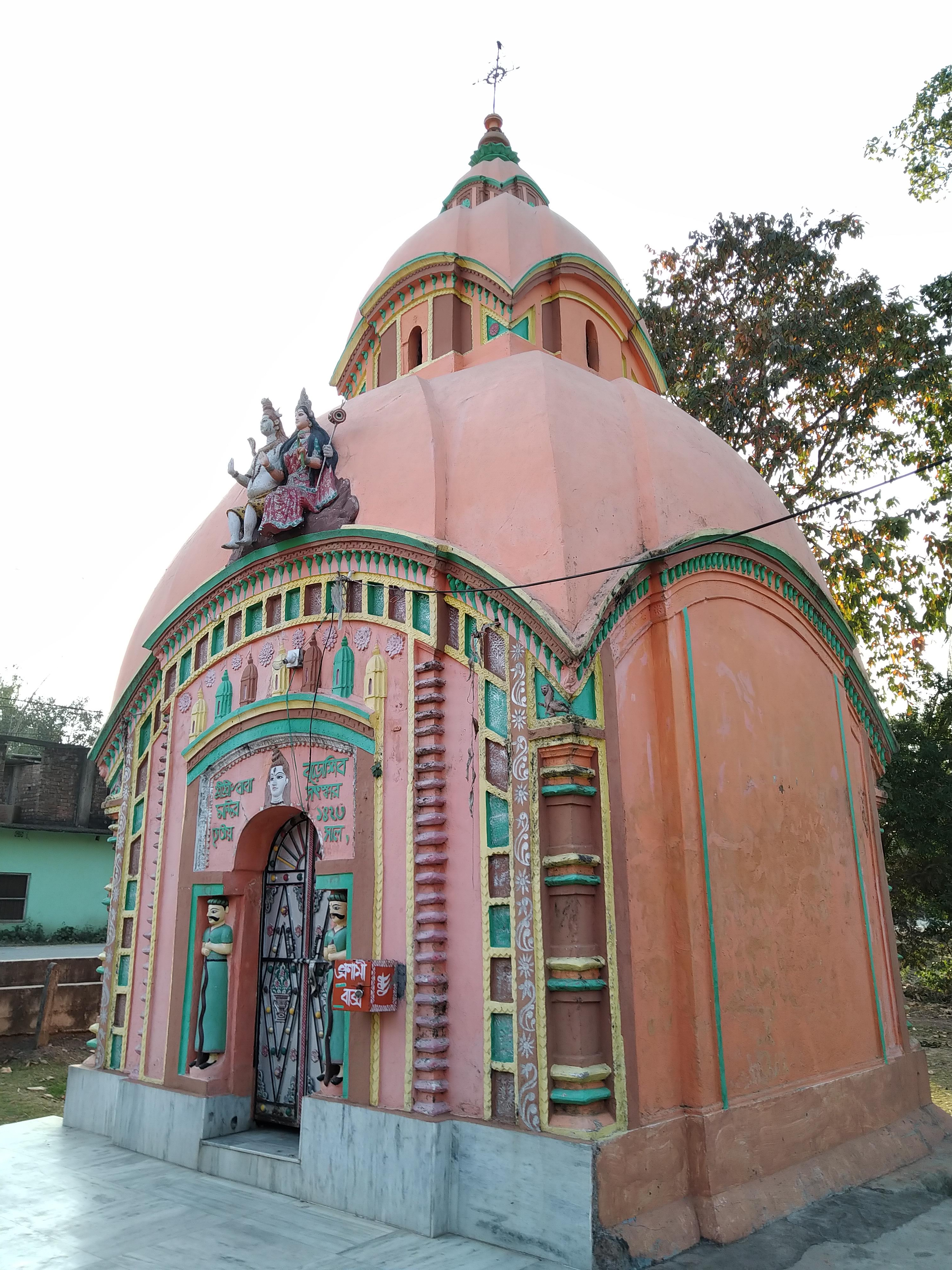
Baro-chala Buro Shiva temple

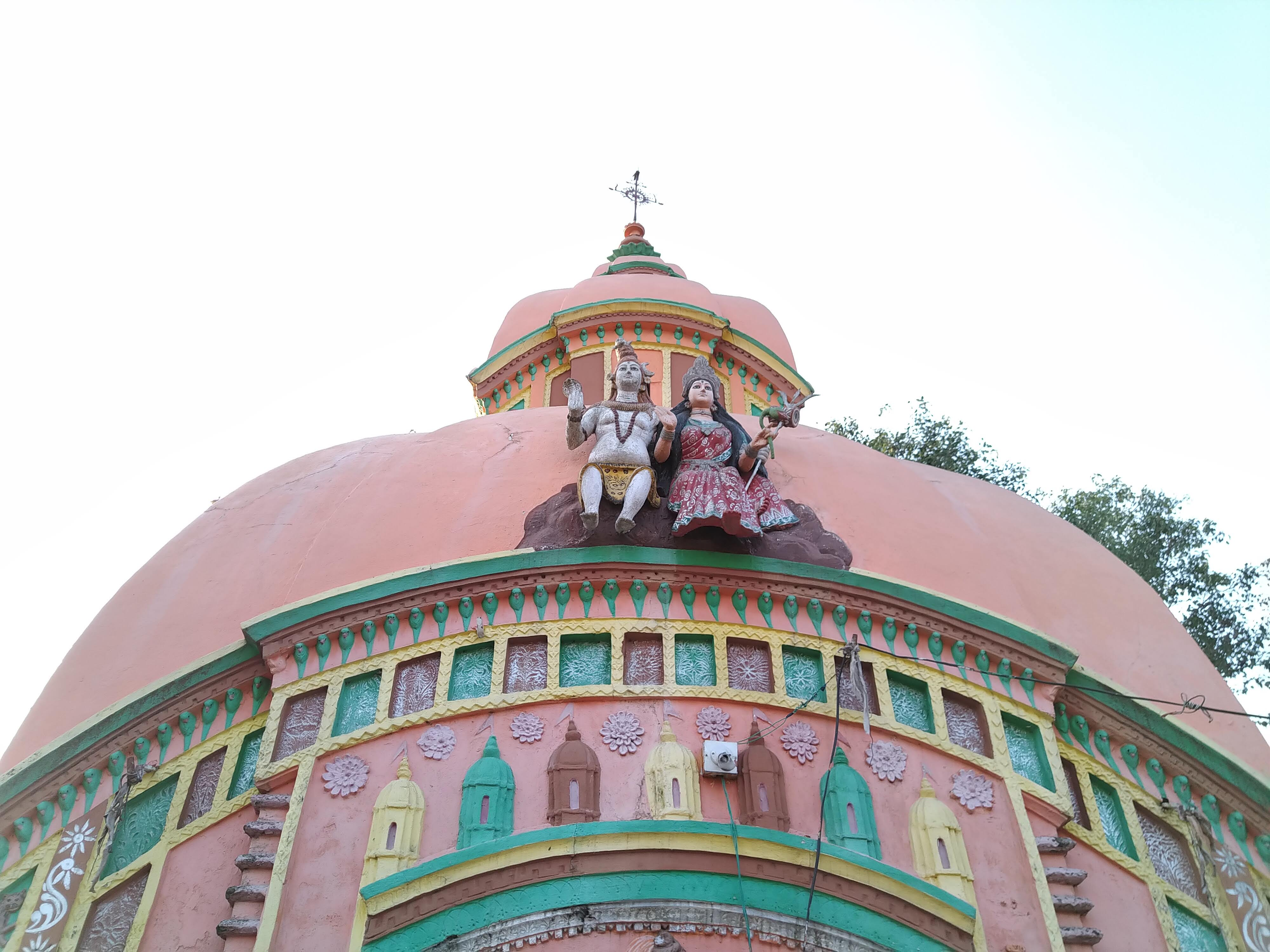
Buro Shiva temple
