= Lachhipur =

- Village
- Location in West Bengal, India Lachhipur (India)
- Coordinates: 22.634634°N 87.641791°E
- Country: India
- State: West Bengal
- District: Paschim Medinipur

Population (2011)
  - Total: 854

Languages
  - Official: Bengali, English
- Time zone: UTC+5:30 (IST)
- PIN: 721232
- Telephone/STD code: 03225
- Lok Sabha constituency: Ghatal
- Vidhan Sabha constituency: Ghatal
- Website: paschimmedinipur.gov.in

Lachhipur is a village in the Ghatal CD block in the Ghatal subdivision of the Paschim Medinipur district in the state of West Bengal, India.

== Geography ==
Cities and towns in Ghatal subdivision of Paschim Medinipur district
M: municipal city/ town, R: rural/ urban centre, H: historical/ religious centre
Owing to space constraints in the small map, the actual locations in a larger map may vary slightly

=== Location ===
Lachhipur is located at 22.634634°N 87.641791°E.

=== Area overview ===
Ishwar Chandra Vidyasagar, scholar, social reformer and a key figure of the Bengal Renaissance, was born at Birsingha on 26 September 1820.

Ghatal subdivision, shown in the map alongside, has alluvial soils. Around 85% of the total cultivated area is cropped more than once. It has a density of population of 1,099 per km^{2}, but being a small subdivision only a little over a fifth of the people in the district reside in this subdivision. 14.33% of the population lives in urban areas and 86.67% lives in the rural areas.

Note: The map alongside presents some of the notable locations in the subdivision. All places marked in the map are linked in the larger full screen map.

== Demographics ==
According to the 2011 Census of India, Lachhipur had a total population of 854, of which 450 (53%) were males and 404 (47%) were females.

== Education ==
Lachhipur Binapani High School is a Bengali-medium coeducational institution established in 1952. The school has facilities for teaching from class V to class XII. It has a library with 2,500 books, 2 computers and a playground.

== Culture ==
David J. McCutchion mention:

- Sridhara temple as a nava-ratna with smooth rekha turrets, built in 1856, it measures 13’ 10" square, with large terracotta figures.
- Rasmancha of the Bag family as a saptadasa-ratna with baroque vase pinnacles, built in 1879, it measures 4’ 6" square, with large terracotta figures.

== Lachhipur picture gallery ==
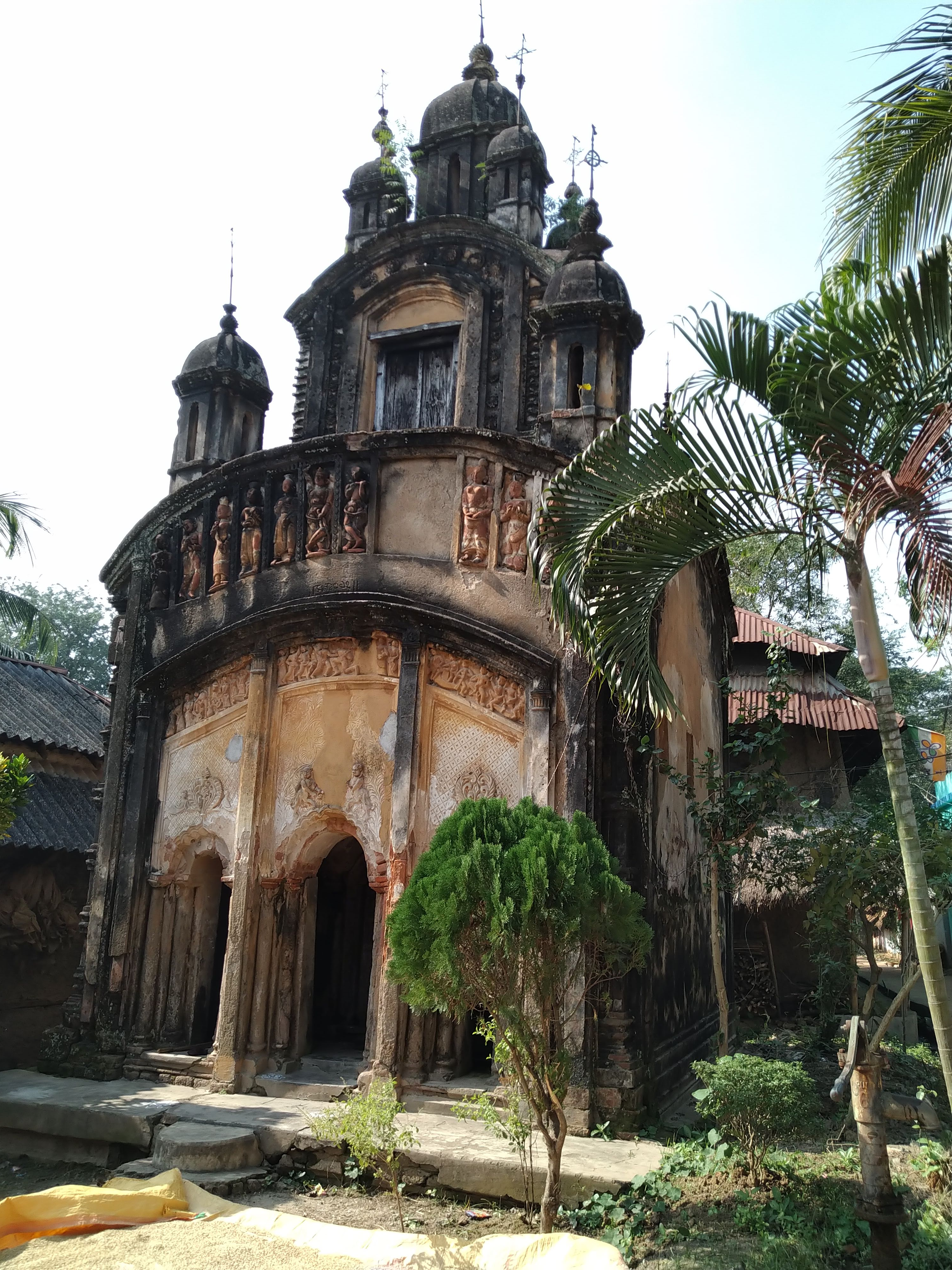
Nava-ratna Sridharjiu temple

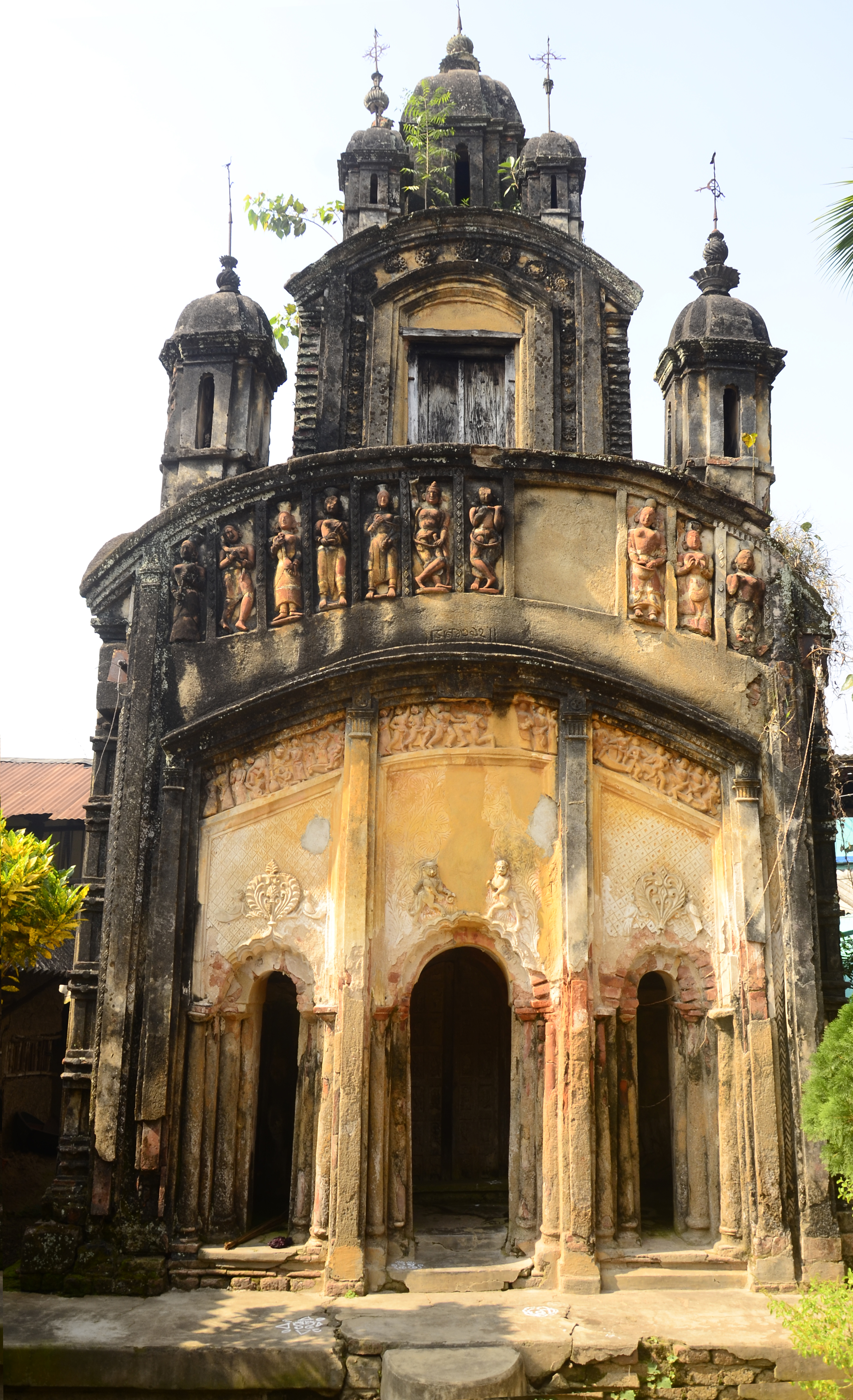
Sridhar jiu temple

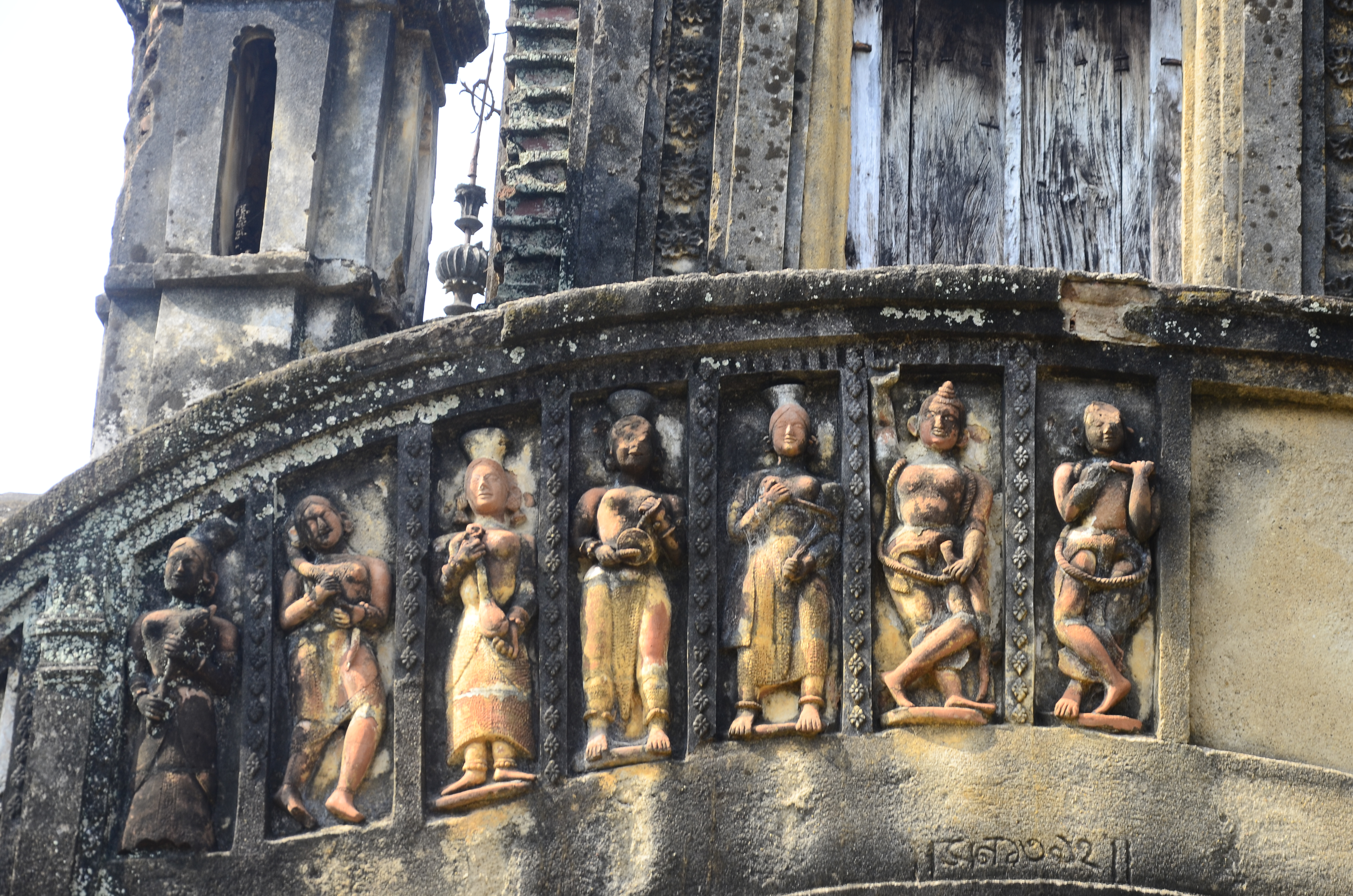
Terracotta figurines

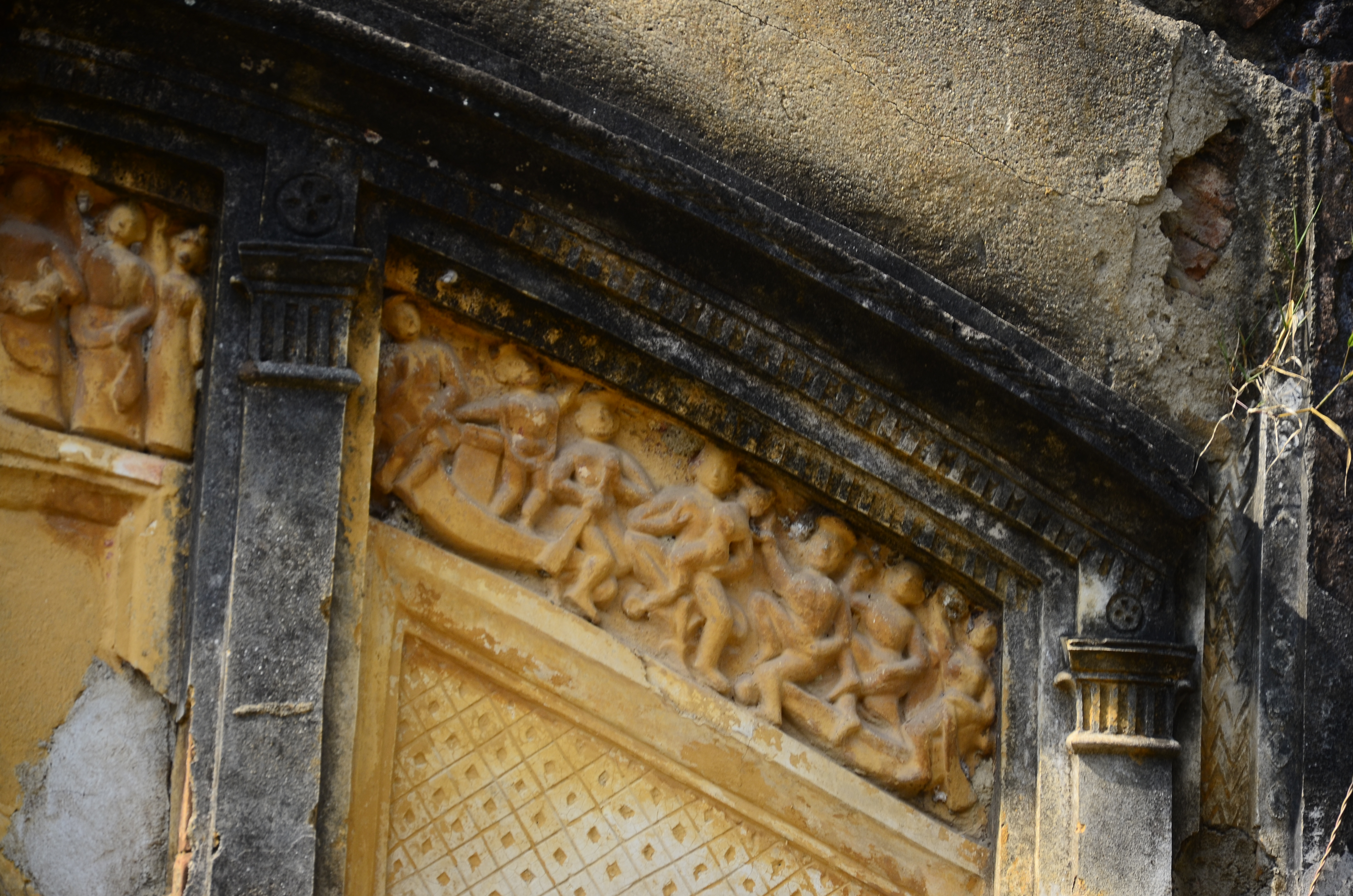
Terracotta figurines
