= Gangadaspur =

- Village
- Location in West Bengal, India Gangadaspur (India)
- Coordinates: 22.716341°N 87.626343°E
- Country: India
- State: West Bengal
- District: Paschim Medinipur

Population (2011)
  - Total: 365

Languages
  - Official: Bengali, English
- Time zone: UTC+5:30 (IST)
- PIN: 721232
- Telephone/STD code: 03225
- Lok Sabha constituency: Ghatal
- Vidhan Sabha constituency: Ghatal
- Website: paschimmedinipur.gov.in

Gangadaspur is a village in the Ghatal CD block in the Ghatal subdivision of the Paschim Medinipur district in the state of West Bengal, India. It is located near Khirpai.

== Geography ==
Cities and towns in Ghatal subdivision of Paschim Medinipur district
M: municipal city/ town, R: rural/ urban centre, H: historical/ religious centre
Owing to space constraints in the small map, the actual locations in a larger map may vary slightly

=== Location ===
Gangadaspur is located at 22.716341°N 87.626343°E.

=== Area overview ===
Ishwar Chandra Vidyasagar, scholar, social reformer and a key figure of the Bengal Renaissance, was born at Birsingha on 26 September 1820.

Ghatal subdivision, shown in the map alongside, has alluvial soils. Around 85% of the total cultivated area is cropped more than once. It has a density of population of 1,099 per km^{2}, but being a small subdivision only a little over a fifth of the people in the district reside in this subdivision. 14.33% of the population lives in urban areas and 86.67% lives in the rural areas.

Note: The map alongside presents some of the notable locations in the subdivision. All places marked in the map are linked in the larger full screen map.

== Demographics ==
According to the 2011 Census of India, Gangadaspur had a total population of 365, of which 194 (53%) were males and 171 (47%) were females.

== Gangadaspur picture gallery ==
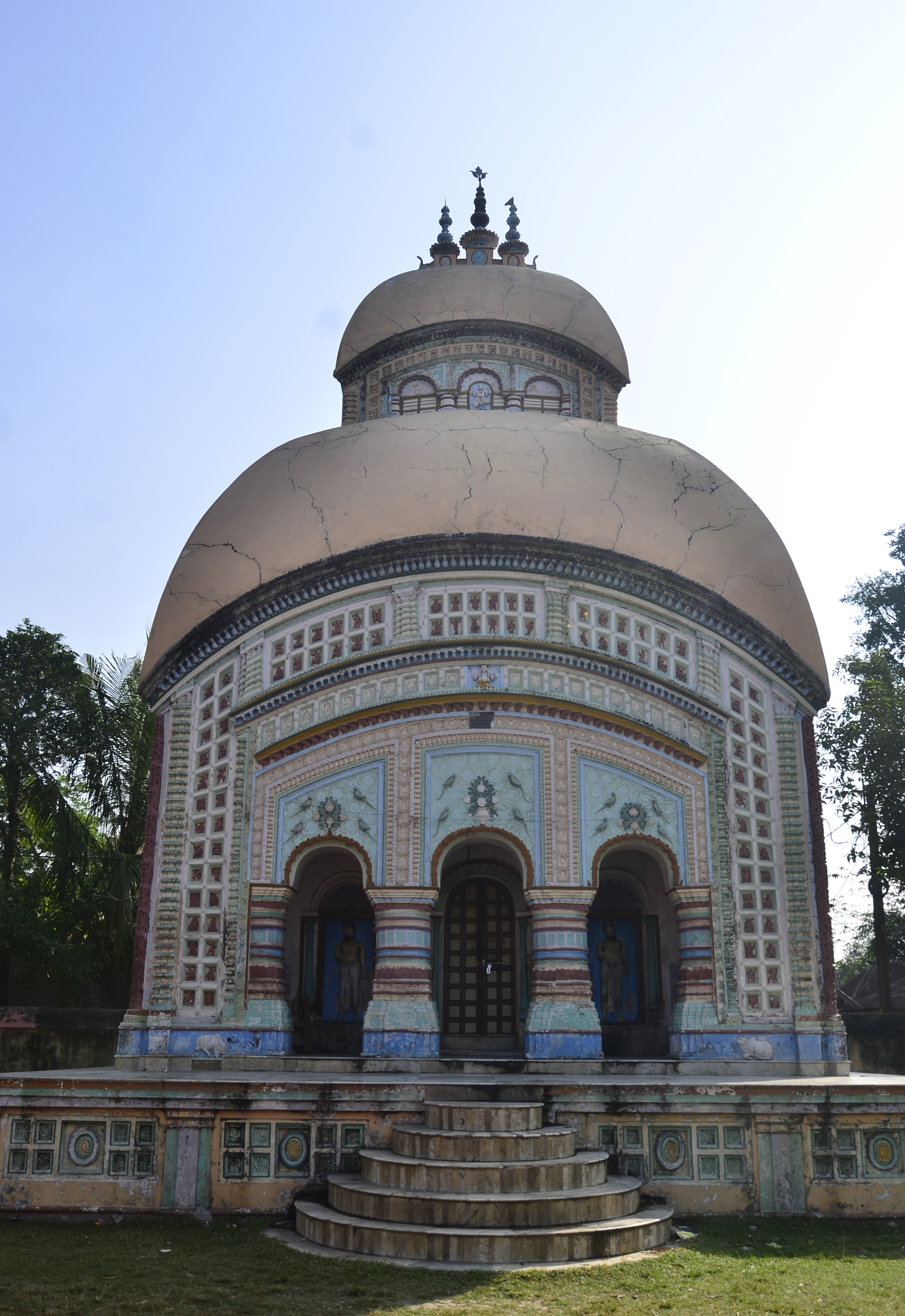
At-chala Umapati Shiva temple built in mid 19th century

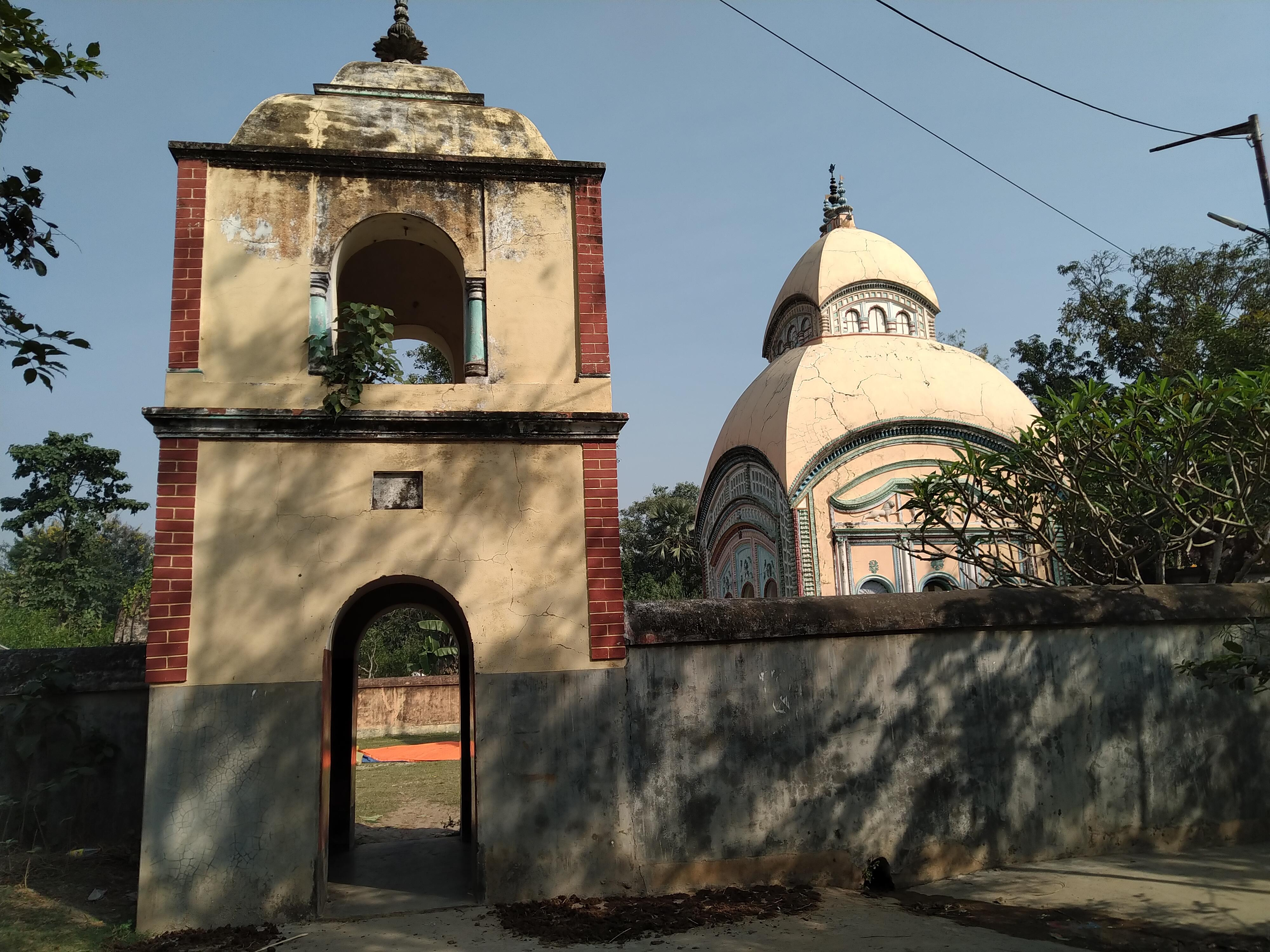
Umapati Shiva temple with Nahabatkhana

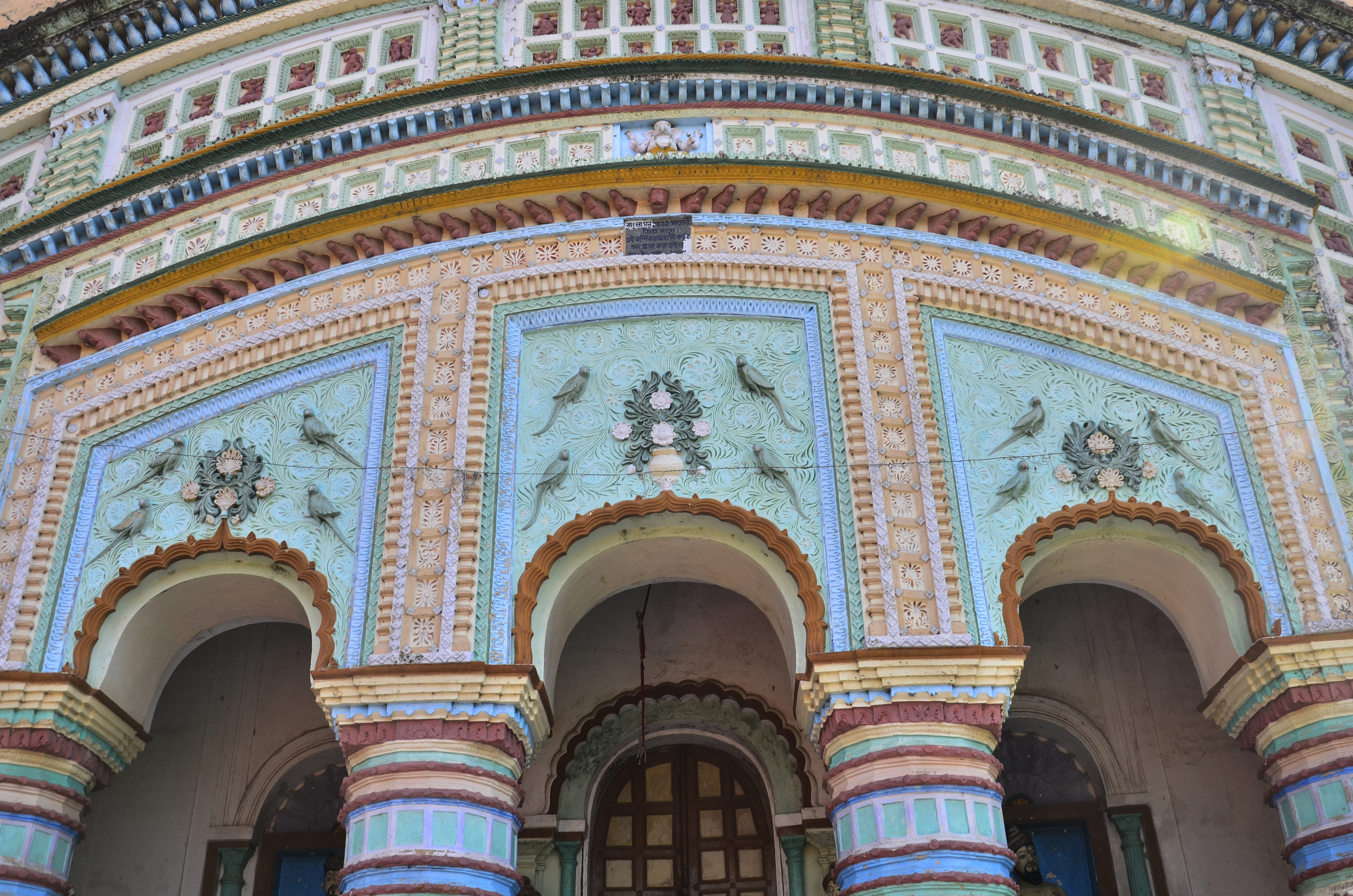
Terracota and stucco work in archway
