= Pradyut =

Pradyut is an Indian given name. Notable people with the name include:

- Pradyut Barman (1935–2016), Indian footballer
- Pradyut Bordoloi (born 1958), Indian politician
- Pradyut Ghosh (born 1970), Indian chemist
