= Ghatal (community development block) =

- Community development block
- Coordinates: 22.666667°N 87.716667°E
- Country: India
- State: West Bengal
- District: Paschim Medinipur

Government
  - Type: Federal democracy

Area
  - Total: 216.05 km^{2} (83.42 sq mi)
- Elevation: 16 m (52 ft)

Population (2011)
  - Total: 219,555
  - Density: 1,016.2/km^{2} (2,632.0/sq mi)

Languages
  - Official: Bengali, English
- Time zone: UTC+5:30 (IST)
- PIN: 721212 (Ghatal)
- Area code: 03225
- Vehicle registration: WB-34
- Literacy: 81.08%
- Lok Sabha constituency: Ghatal
- Vidhan Sabha constituency: Ghatal
- Website: paschimmedinipur.gov.in

Ghatal is a community development block that forms an administrative division in Ghatal subdivision of Paschim Medinipur district in the Indian state of West Bengal.

== Geography ==
In Ghatal CD block the soil is fertile alluvial and the area is a flat deltaic country intersected by numerous rivers and water courses. It is a flood prone area and is affected by water logging in the rainy season. 95% of the cultivated area has alluvial soil and 5% has lateritic soil.

Ghatal is located at 22°40′00″N 87°43′00″E.

Ghatal CD block is bounded by Goghat I CD block, in Hooghly district, in the north, Khanakul I and Khanakul II CD blocks, in Hooghly district, in the east, Daspur I CD block in the south and Chandrakona I CD block in the west.

It is located 58 km from Midnapore, the district headquarters.

Ghatal CD block has an area of 216.05 km^{2}. It has 1 panchayat samity, 12 gram panchayats, 166 gram sansads (village councils), 145 mouzas and 139 inhabited villages. Ghatal police station serves this block. Headquarters of this CD block is at Ghatal.

Gram panchayats of Ghatal block/ panchayat samiti are: Ajabnagar I, Ajabnagar II, Birsingha, Dewanchak I, Dewanchak II, Irhpala, Mansuka I, Mansuka II, Mohanpur, Monoharpur I, Monoharpur II and Sultanpur.

== Notable people ==
Ishwar Chandra Vidyasagar, scholar, social reformer and a key figure of the Bengal Renaissance, was born at Birsingha, now in this CD block, on 26 September 1820.

== Demographics ==
=== Population ===
According to the 2011 Census of India Ghatal CD block had a total population of 219,555, all of which were rural. There were 113,199 (52%) males and 106,356 (48%) females. Population below 6 years was 25,546. Scheduled Castes numbered 72,243 (32.90%) and Scheduled Tribes numbered 3,681 (1.76%).

As per the 2001 census, Ghatal block had a total population of 190,705, out of which 96,605 were males and 94,100 were females. Ghatal block registered a population growth of 11.83 per cent during the 1991-2001 decade. Decadal growth for the combined Midnapore district was 14.87 per cent. Decadal growth in West Bengal was 17.45 per cent.

Large villages (with 4,000+ population) in Ghatal CD block are (2011 census figures in brackets): Sultanpur (4,206), Erpala (4,503), Mansukha (8,583), Dirghagram (4,513), Dwandipur (4,060), Radhanagar (5,827), Shilarajnagar (4,082), Pratappur (4,699), Ratneshwar Bati (4,176) and Gopmohal urf Manoharpur (7,010).

Other villages in Ghatal CD block include (2011 census figures in brackets): Mohanpur (2,296), Ajabnagar (3,682), Birsingha (3,026), Dewanchak (536), Alui (1,627), Gangadaspur (365), Iswarpur (880), Jalshara (2,183), Lachhipur (854) and Radhanagar (5,827).

=== Literacy ===
According to the 2011 census the total number of literate persons in Ghatal CD block was 157,301 (81.08% of the population over 6 years) out of which males numbered 88,481 (83.34% of the male population over 6 years) and females numbered 68,820 (73.33% of the female population over 6 years). The gender gap in literacy rates was 15.01%.

See also – List of West Bengal districts ranked by literacy rate

Literacy in CD blocks of
Paschim Medinipur district
Jhargram subdivision
Binpur I – 69.74%
Binpur II – 70.46%
Gopiballavpur I – 65.44%
Gopiballavpur II – 71.40%
Jamboni – 72.63%
Jhargram – 72.23%
Nayagram – 63.70%
Sankrail – 73.35%
Medinipur Sadar subdivision
Garhbeta I – 72.21%
Garhbeta II – 75.87%
Garhbeta III – 73.42%
Keshpur – 77.88%
Midnapore Sadar – 70.48%
Salboni – 74.87%
Ghatal subdivision
Chandrakona I – 78.93%
Chandrakona II – 75.96%
Daspur I – 83.99%
Daspur II – 85.62%
Ghatal – 81.08%
Kharagpur subdivision
Dantan I – 73.53%
Dantan II – 82.45%
Debra – 82.03%
Keshiari – 76.78%
Kharagpur I – 77.06%
Kharagpur II – 76.08%
Mohanpur – 80.51%
Narayangarh – 78.31%
Pingla – 83.57%
Sabang – 86.84%
2011 Census: CD Block Wise

Primary Census Abstract Data

=== Language and religion ===
Religion in Ghatal CD block (2011)
Hinduism	89.95%
Islam	9.77%
Other or not stated	0.28%

In the 2011 census Hindus numbered 197,488 and formed 89.95% of the population in Ghatal CD block. Muslims numbered 21,450 and formed 9.77% of the population. Others numbered 617 and formed 0.28% of the population. Others include Addi Bassi, Marang Boro, Santal, Saranath, Sari Dharma, Sarna, Alchchi, Bidin, Sant, Saevdharm, Seran, Saran, Sarin, Kheria, Christians and other religious communities. In 2001, Hindus were 90.71% and Muslims 9.24% of the population respectively.

Languages of Ghatal CD block (2011)
1. Bengali (98.6%)
2. Santali (1.38%)
3. Others (0.03%)

At the time of the 2011 census, 98.59% of the population spoke Bengali and 1.38% Santali as their first language.

== BPL families ==
In Ghatal CD block 38.86% families were living below poverty line in 2007.

According to the District Human Development Report of Paschim Medinipur: The 29 CD blocks of the district were classified into four categories based on the poverty ratio. Nayagram, Binpur II and Jamboni CD blocks have very high poverty levels (above 60%). Kharagpur I, Kharagpur II, Sankrail, Garhbeta II, Pingla and Mohanpur CD blocks have high levels of poverty (50-60%), Jhargram, Midnapore Sadar, Dantan I, Gopiballavpur II, Binpur I, Dantan II, Keshiari, Chandrakona I, Gopiballavpur I, Chandrakona II, Narayangarh, Keshpur, Ghatal, Sabang, Garhbeta I, Salboni, Debra and Garhbeta III CD blocks have moderate levels of poverty (25-50%) and Daspur II and Daspur I CD blocks have low levels of poverty (below 25%).

== Economy ==
=== Infrastructure ===
139 or 80% of mouzas in Ghatal CD block were electrified by 31 March 2014.

145 mouzas in Ghatal CD block had drinking water facilities in 2013-14. There were 231 fertiliser depots, 100 seed stores and 50 fair price shops in the CD Block.

=== Agriculture ===
Persons engaged in agriculture
in Ghatal CD block
1. Bargadars (10.1%)
2. Patta holders (13.5%)
3. Small farmers (2.61%)
4. Marginal farmers (30.2%)
5. Agricultural labourers (43.6%)

Although the Bargadari Act of 1950 recognised the rights of bargadars to a higher share of crops from the land that they tilled, it was not fully implemented. Large tracts, beyond the prescribed limit of land ceiling, remained with the rich landlords. From 1977 onwards major land reforms took place in West Bengal. Land in excess of land ceiling was acquired and distributed amongst the peasants. Following land reforms land ownership pattern has undergone transformation. In 2013-14, persons engaged in agriculture in Ghatal CD block could be classified as follows: bargadars 10.12%, patta (document) holders 13.46%, small farmers (possessing land between 1 and 2 hectares) 2.61%, marginal farmers (possessing land up to 1 hectare) 30.19% and agricultural labourers 43.62%.

In 2005-06 the nett cropped area in Ghatal CD block was 19,800 hectares, out of a geographical area of 23,901 hectares, and the area in which more than one crop was grown was 16,326 hectares.

The extension of irrigation has played a role in growth of the predominantly agricultural economy. In 2013-14, the total area irrigated in Ghatal CD block was 13,730 hectares, out of which 70 hectares were irrigated by canal water, 250 hectares by tank water, 11,400 hectares by deep tubewells, 305 hectares by shallow tubewells, 1,700 hectares by river lift irrigation and 5 hectares by other methods.

In 2013-14, Ghatal CD block produced 17,577 tonnes of Aman paddy, the main winter crop, from 9,944 hectares, 4,536 tonnes of Aus paddy (summer crop) from 1,959 hectares, 37,964 tonnes of Boro paddy (spring crop) from 12,040 hectares, 16 tonnes of wheat from 7 hectares, 25,123 tonnes of jute from 1,448 hectares and 37,640 tonnes of potatoes from 2,289 hectares. It also produced pulses and oilseeds.

=== Banking ===
In 2013-14, Ghatal CD block had offices of 11 commercial banks and 3 gramin banks.

== Transport ==
Ghatal CD block has 13 ferry services and 7 originating/ terminating bus routes. The nearest railway station is 45 km from the CD block headquarters.

== Education ==
In 2013-14, Ghatal CD block had 168 primary schools with 14,197 students, 5 middle schools with 278 students, 21 high schools with 8,235 students and 12 higher secondary schools with 9,953 students. Ghatal CD block had 375 institutions for special and non-formal education with 12,311 students.

The United Nations Development Programme considers the combined primary and secondary enrolment ratio as the simple indicator of educational achievement of the children in the school going age. The infrastructure available is important. In Ghatal CD block out of the total 168 primary schools in 2008-2009, 100 had pucca buildings, 21 partially pucca, 2 kucha and 45 multiple type.

Ghatal Rabindra Satabirshiki Mahavidyalaya, established in 1961, is the general degree college in this block.

== Culture ==
The Ghatal CD block has several heritage temples.

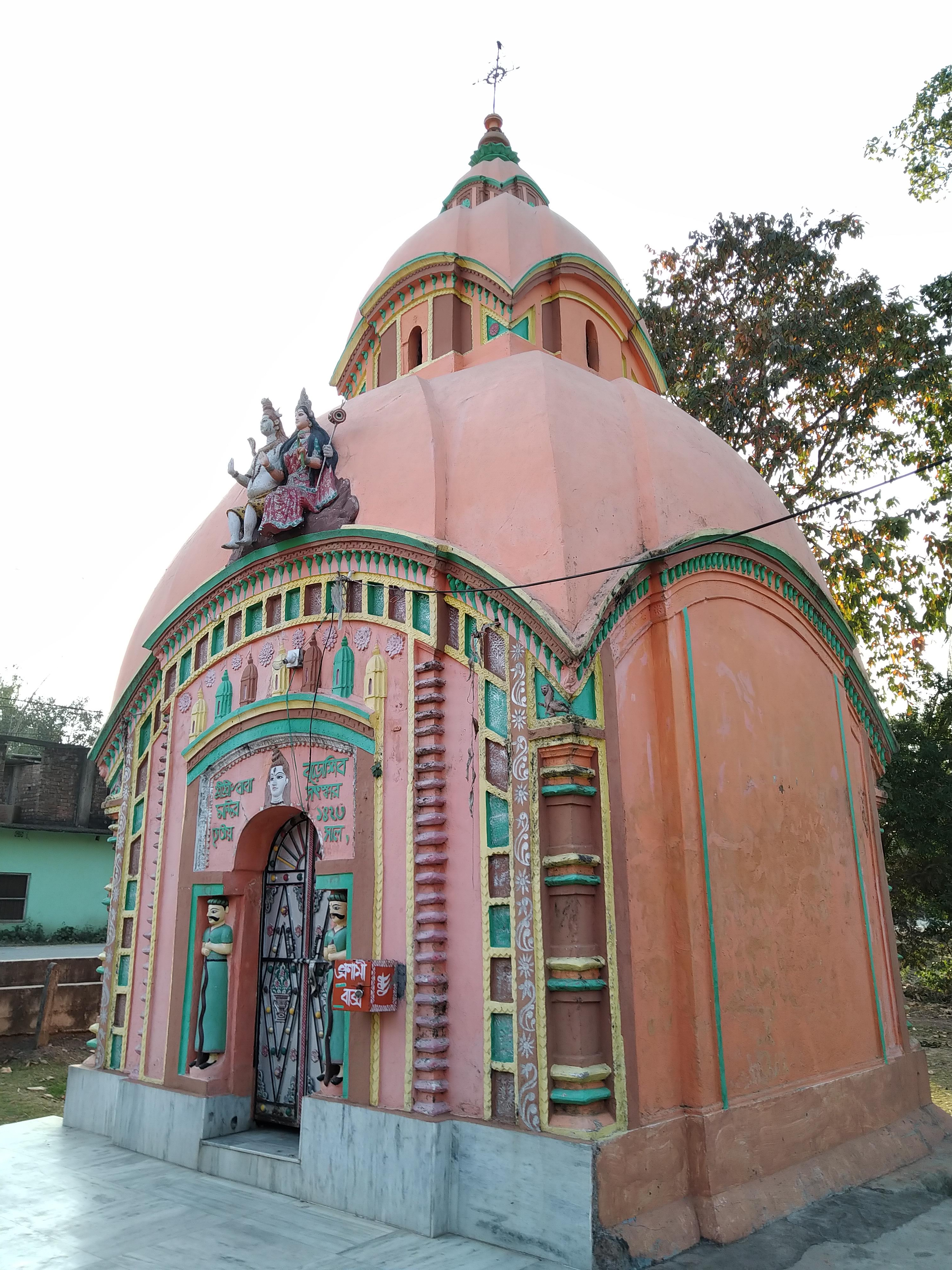
Jalshara: Baro chala Buro Shiva temple

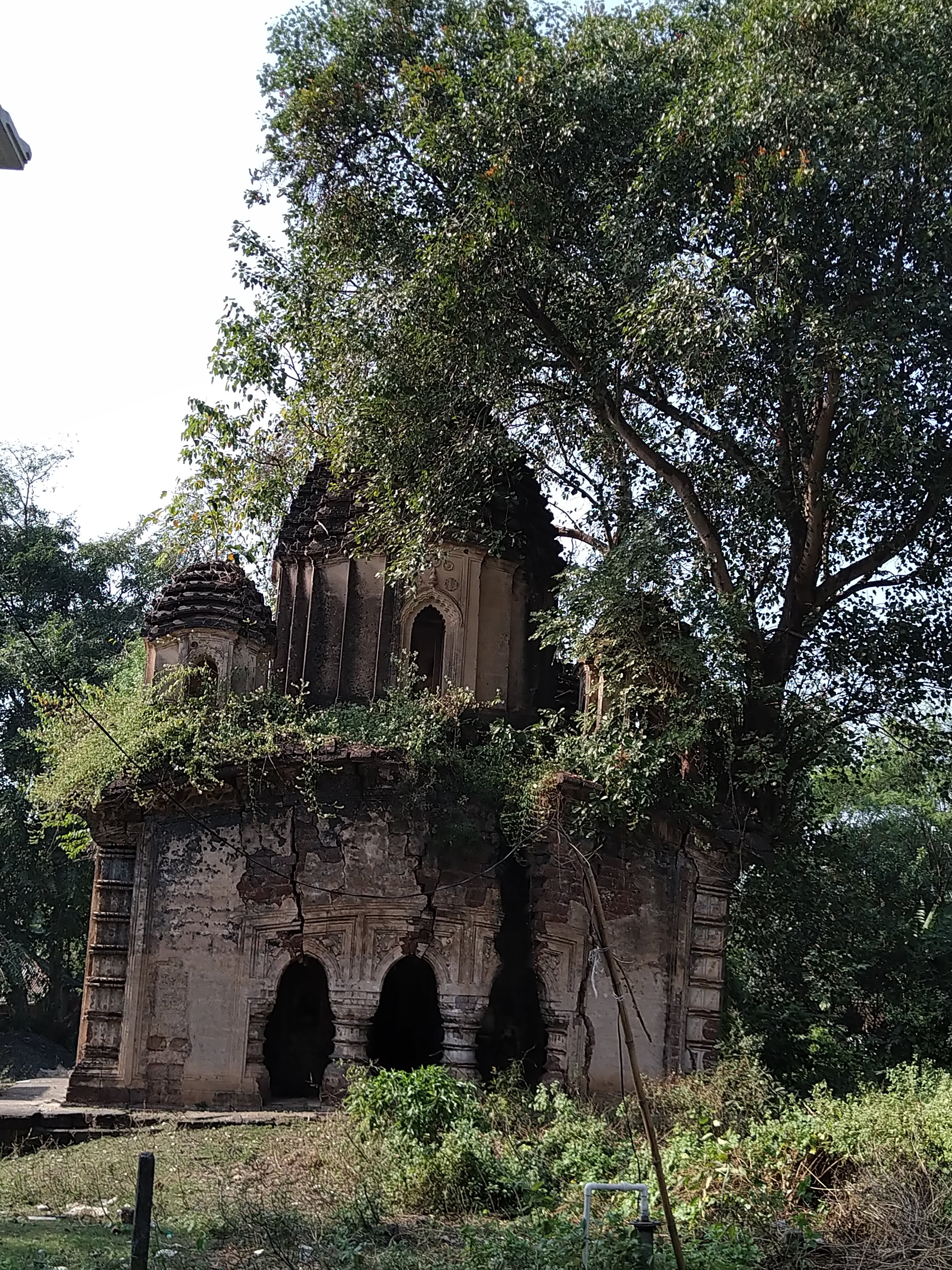
Radhanagar: Pancha ratna Gopinath temple (in picture), laterite built in 1718, at Radhanagar and Pancha ratna Singhabahini temple at Nabagram, built in 1709, with exquisite terracotta carvings, both endangered.

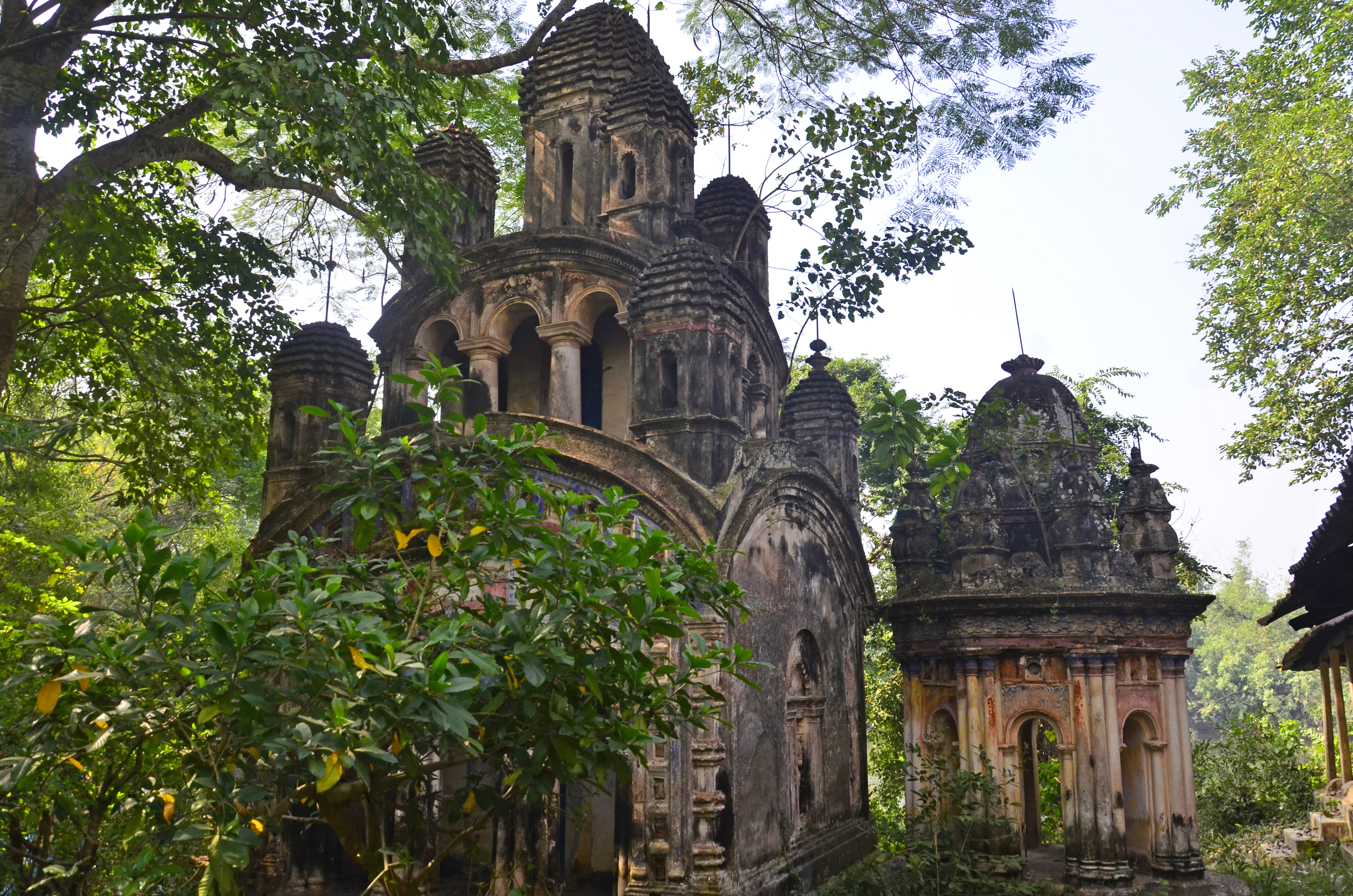
Alui: Nava ratna Sridhara temple with rasmancha built in 1880 (in picture) and another nava ratna temple built in 1860 (renovated), both with terracotta carvings.

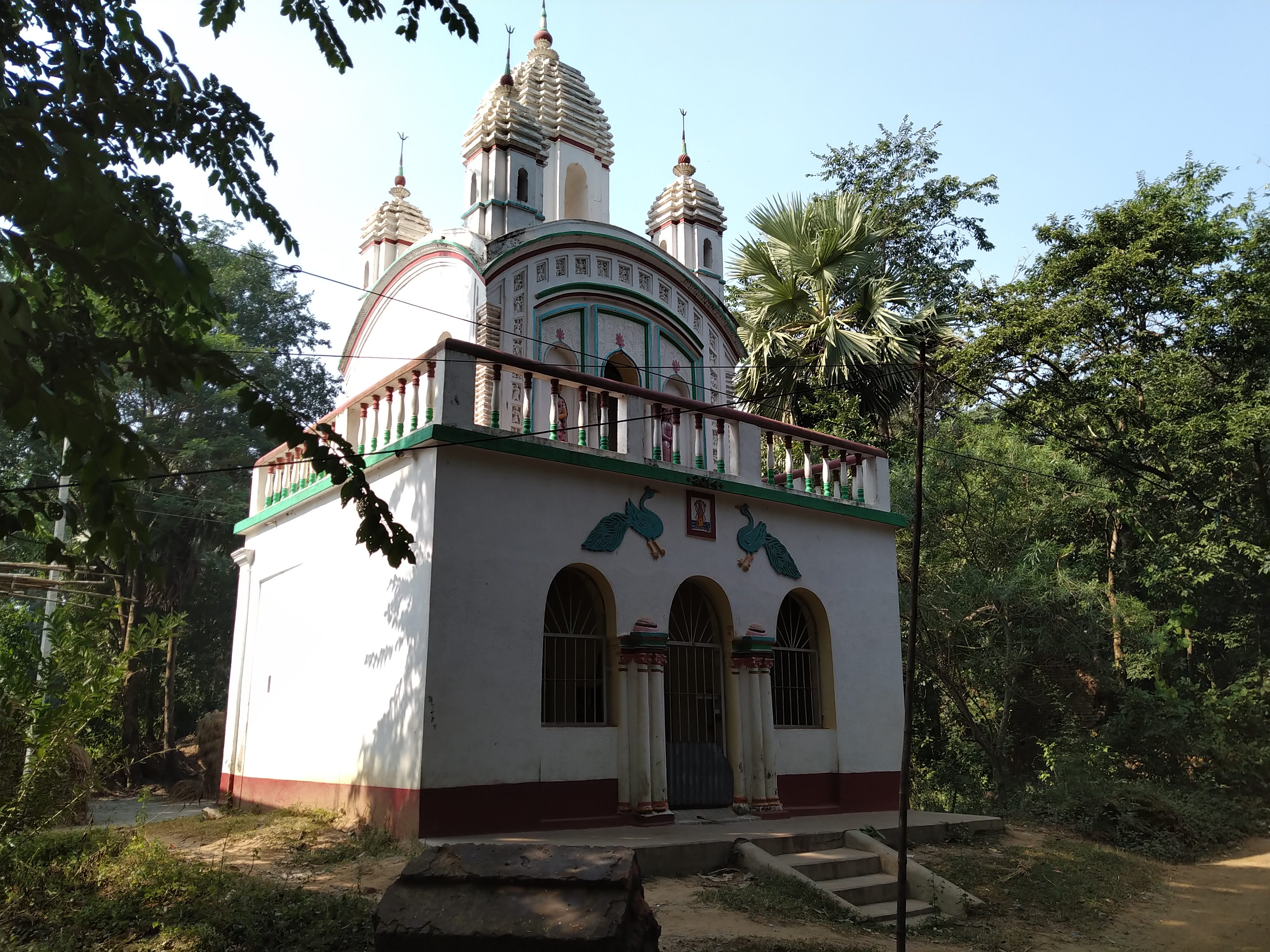
Iswarpur: Pancha ratna on a flat roof Sridharjiu temple.

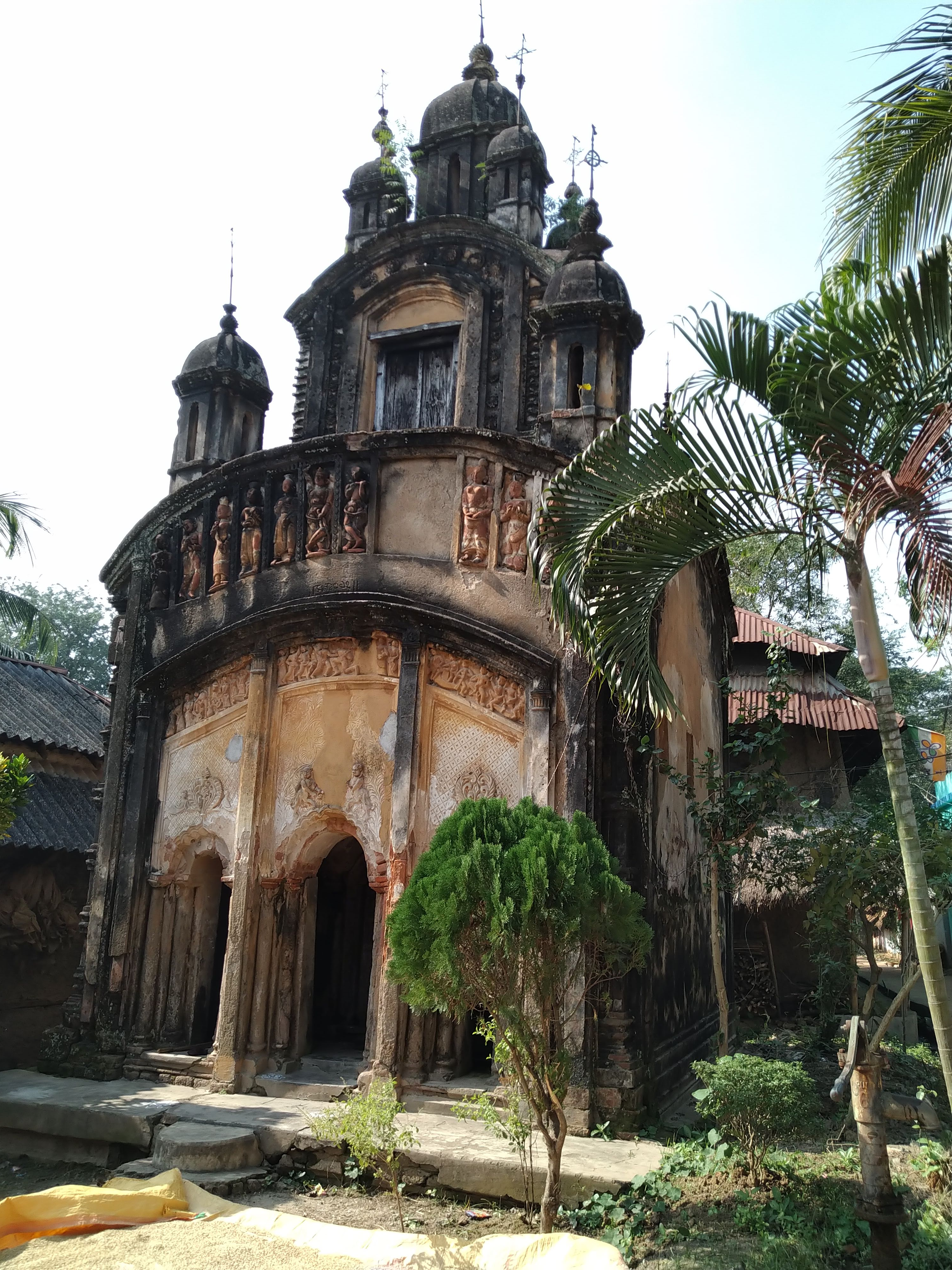
Lachhipur: Nava ratna Sridharjiu temple, built in 1865, with large terracotta figures.

== Healthcare ==
In 2014, Ghatal CD block had 1 block primary health centre and 2 primary health centres with total 26 beds and 7 doctors. It had 32 family welfare sub centres and 1 family welfare centre. 1,266 patients were treated indoor and 61,746 patients were treated outdoor in the hospitals, health centres and subcentres of the CD block.

Vidyasagar Block Primary Health Centre, with 10 beds at Birsingha, is the major government medical facility in the Ghatal CD block. There are primary health centres at: Khasbarh (with 6 beds) and Natuk (with 10 beds).
