= Pradyut Ghosh =

Indian chemist and professor (born 1970)

- Born: 17 February 1970 (age 56); Birsingha, Medinipur District, West Bengal, India
- Education: Rajabazar Science College; Calcutta University; IIT Kanpur; Texas A&M University; University of Bonn
- Known for: Studies on chemical sensing of anions, interlocked molecules and self-assembly
- Awards: 1998 ISCA Young Scientist Award; 2004 CSIR Young Scientist Award; 2009 B. M. Birla Science Prize; 2012 CRSI Bronze Medal; 2015 Shanti Swarup Bhatnagar Prize
- Scientific career
- Fields: Inorganic chemistry; Supramolecular chemistry
- Workplaces: Central Salt and Marine Chemicals Research Institute; Indian Association for the Cultivation of Science
- Doctoral advisor: Parimal K. Bharadwaj; Richard M. Crooks; Fritz Vögtle; Christoph Schalley

Pradyut Ghosh (born 17 February 1970) is an Indian inorganic chemist and a professor at the Indian Association for the Cultivation of Science. He is known for his studies on chemical sensing of anions, interlocked molecules and self-assembly. He is a recipient of the Swarnajayanthi Fellowship of the Department of Science and Technology and the Bronze Medal of the Chemical Research Society of India. The Council of Scientific and Industrial Research, the apex agency of the Government of India for scientific research, awarded him the Shanti Swarup Bhatnagar Prize for Science and Technology, one of the highest Indian science awards, in 2015, for his contributions to chemical sciences.

== Biography ==
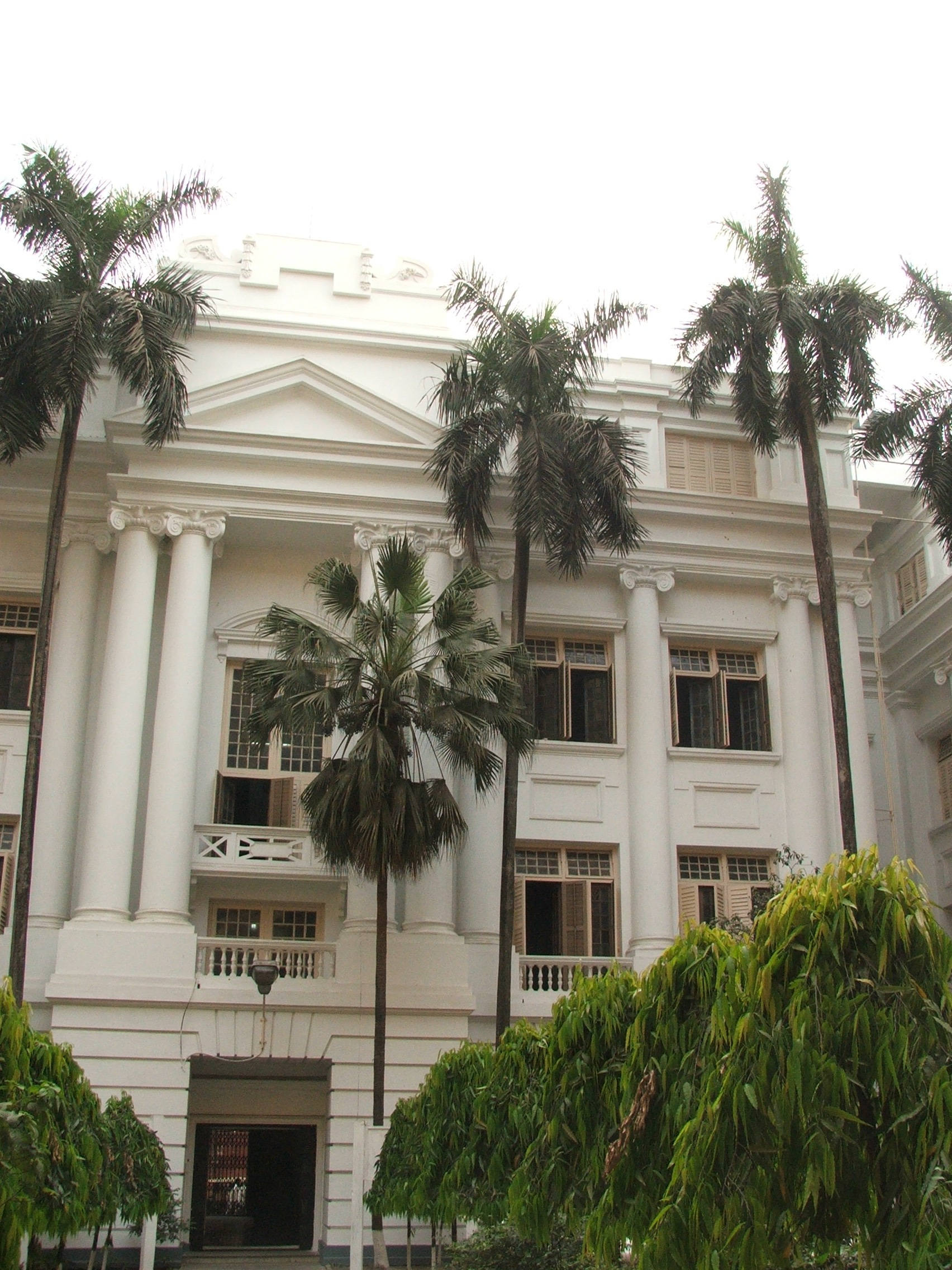
University of Calcutta

Born on 17 February 1970 in a farmers' family in the village of Birsingha in Medinipur District of the Indian state of West Bengal, Pradyut Ghosh graduated in chemistry in 1990. He followed it up with a master's degree in 1992 from the Rajabazar Science College, Calcutta University. Enrolling for his doctoral studies under the guidance of Parimal K. Bharadwaj at the Indian Institute of Technology, Kanpur, he secured a PhD in 1998 and moved to the US to pursue his post-doctoral studies under Richard M. Crooks. Returning to India in 2000, he joined the Central Salt and Marine Chemicals Research Institute (CSMCRI) as a scientist. In 2001, he received an Alexander von Humboldt fellowship which enabled him to continue his professional studies with Fritz Vögtle and Christoph Schalley at the Kekulé Institute of Organic Chemistry and Biochemistry of the University of Bonn. He resumed his duties at CSMCRI in 2002 as a C-Grade Scientist, a post he held till 2007 during which time he had a second spell at Bonn University from April to October 2003. In 2007, he joined the Indian Association for the Cultivation of Science as an assistant professor where he served as the head of the department of inorganic chemistry from 2012 to 2015 and is a professor there.

== Legacy ==
Ghosh is reported to have done extensive researches on Anion recognition, molecular capsules, chemical sensing of Ions, inorganic salt extraction, supramolecular aggregations and interlocking molecules. He has developed several ligands with varying anion recognition elements as well as methodologies for selective sensing of phosphates, separation of hydrated metal sulphates/potassium bromide and bromide removal using halogen bonding. The development of Gypsum chalk replacing the calcium carbonate-made chalk which was in use traditionally was one of his notable contributions. His research has been documented by way of a number of peer-reviewed articles; ResearchGate, an online repository of scientific articles, has listed 112 of them. He holds a patent for the process developed by him viz. Process for the recovery of palladium from spent silica. He was on the national organizing committee of the inaugural Frontiers of Organometallic Chemistry, a biennial symposium on Organometallics held at Thiruvananthapuram in December 2016. He has delivered several invitational and plenary addresses. He has also mentored several scholars in their doctoral and post-doctoral studies. He has been involved in a number of projects for agencies such as the Council of Scientific and Industrial Research, The World Academy of Sciences, the Department of Science and Technology of India and the Science and Engineering Research Board.

== Awards and honors ==
Ghosh received the Young Scientist Award of the Indian Science Congress Association in 1998, and the Young Scientist Award of the Council of Scientific and Industrial Research in 2004. The B. M. Birla Science Prize in Chemical Sciences was awarded to him in 2009, the same year as he received the Swarnajayanthi Fellowship of the Department of Science and Technology. This was followed by the Bronze Medal of the Chemical Research Society of India in 2012. The Council of Scientific and Industrial Research honored him again with the Shanti Swarup Bhatnagar Prize, one of the highest Indian science awards, in 2015.

== See also ==
- Halogen bond
