= Birsingha =

- Village
- Location within West Bengal Location within India
- Coordinates: 22.7225°N 87.6562°E
- Country: India
- State: West Bengal
- District: Paschim Medinipur
- Elevation: 19 m (62 ft)

Population (2011)
  - Total: 3,026

Languages
  - Official: Bengali, English
- Time zone: UTC+5:30 (IST)
- ISO 3166 code: IN-WB
- Lok Sabha constituency: Ghatal
- Website: paschimmedinipur.gov.in

Birsingha is a large village located in Ghatal Block of Paschim Medinipur district, West Bengal. Earlier this village was part of Hooghly District. Birsingha village is famous for the birthplace of the great Bengali social reformer and the author of Varna Parichay Pandit Ishwar Chandra Vidyasagar.

== Geography ==
Cities and towns in Ghatal subdivision of Paschim Medinipur district
M: municipal city/ town, R: rural/ urban centre, H: historical/ religious centre
Owing to space constraints in the small map, the actual locations in a larger map may vary slightly

=== Location ===
Birsingha is located at 22.7225°N 87.6562°E.

=== Area overview ===
Ishwar Chandra Vidyasagar, scholar, social reformer and a key figure of the Bengal Renaissance, was born at Birsingha on 26 September 1820.

Ghatal subdivision, shown in the map alongside, has alluvial soils. Around 85% of the total cultivated area is cropped more than once. It has a density of population of 1,099 per km^{2}, but being a small subdivision only a little over a fifth of the people in the district reside in this subdivision. 14.33% of the population lives in urban areas and 86.67% lives in the rural areas.

Note: The map alongside presents some of the notable locations in the subdivision. All places marked in the map are linked in the larger full screen map.

== Demographics ==
According to the 2011 Census of India, Birsingha had a total population of 3,026, of which 1,588 (52%) were males and 1,438 (48%) were females. There were 342 persons in the age range of 0–6 years. The total number of literate persons in Birsingha was 2,343 (87.30% of the population over 6 years).

== Notable people ==
- Ishwar Chandra Vidyasagar
- Pradyut Ghosh

== Education ==
Birsingha Bhagabati Vidyalaya is the oldest school in this area. Birsingha Vidyasagar Balika Vidyapith is a Bengali-medium girls' only institution established in 1971. The school has facilities for teaching from class V to class X. It has a library with 200 books and 15 computers. It is housed in a government building.

Birsingha Primary School was established in 1929.

== Gallery ==
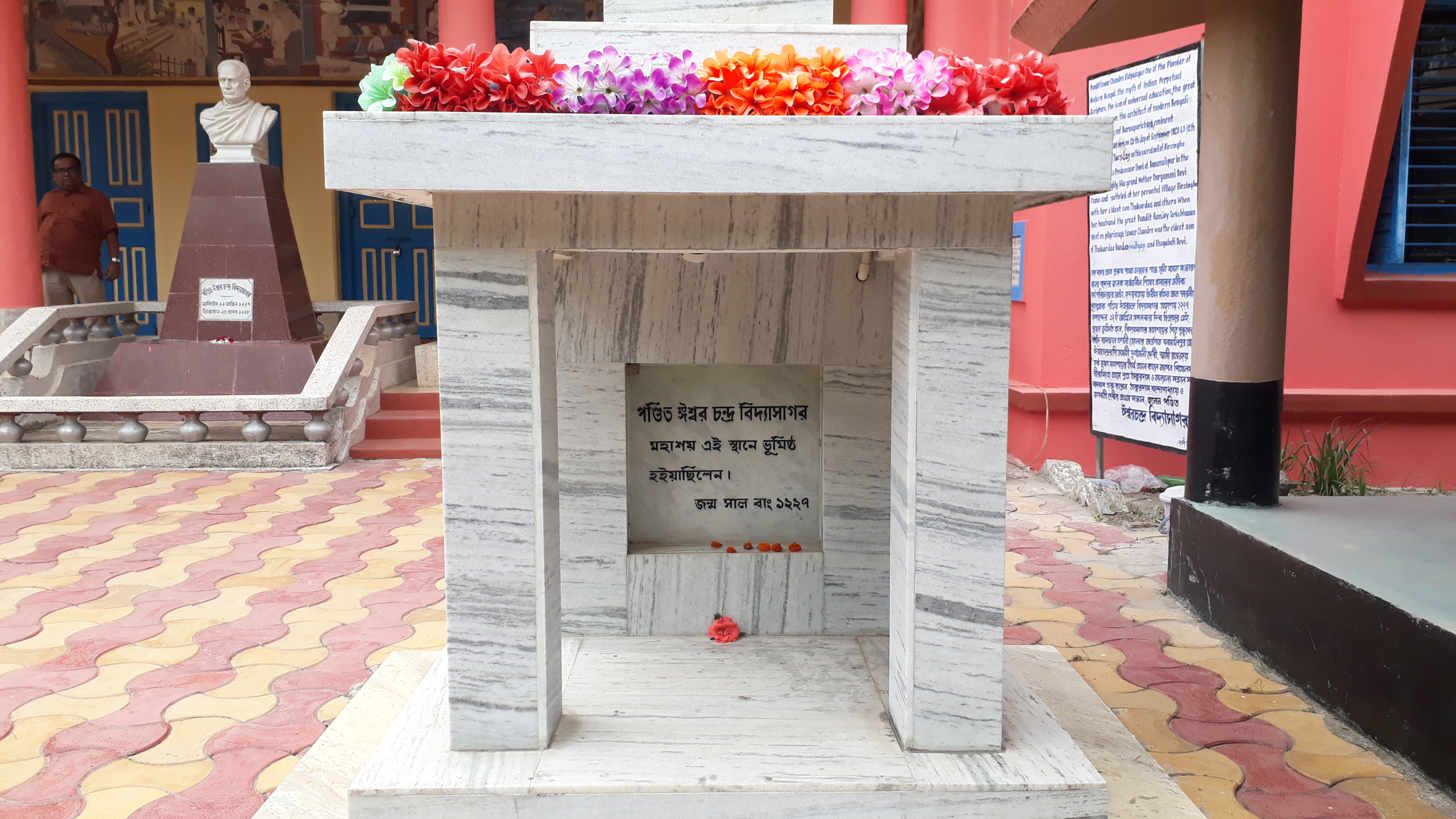
Birthplace of Ishwar Chandra Vidyasagar in Birsingha

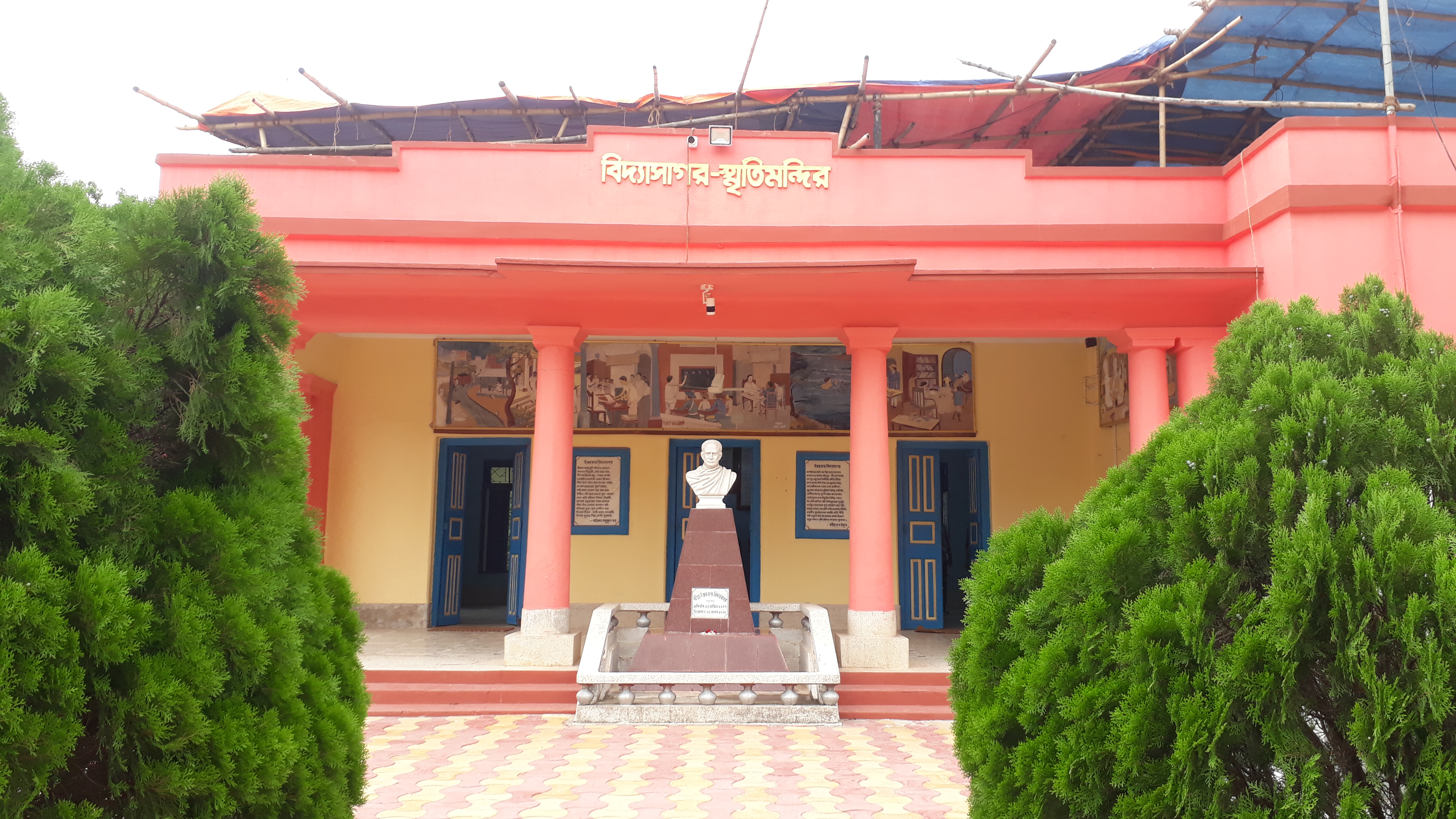
House and museum of Vidyasagar

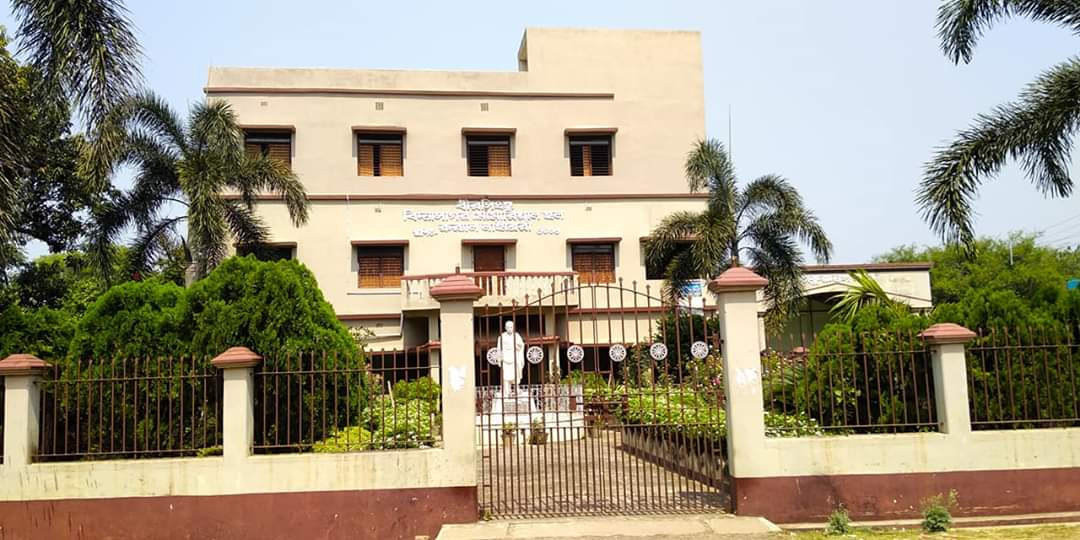
Birsingha Vidyasagar Memorial Hall

== Healthcare ==
Vidyasagar Block Primary Health Centre, with 10 beds at Birsingha, is the major government medical facility in the Ghatal CD block.
