= Gandhigram =

Gandhigram may refer to:

- Gandhigram, Arunachal Pradesh, a town in Arunachal Pradesh, India
- Gandhigram railway station, Ahmedabad, Gujarat, India
- Gandhigram, Tamil Nadu, a village in Tamil Nadu, India
- Gandhigram, Tripura, a town in Tripura, India
- Gandhigram, Visakhapatnam, a neighbourhood in Visakhapatnam, Andhra Pradesh, India
