= Bengali Hindus =

Ethno-linguistic and religious population from India and Bangladesh

Bengali Hindus বাঙালি হিন্দু

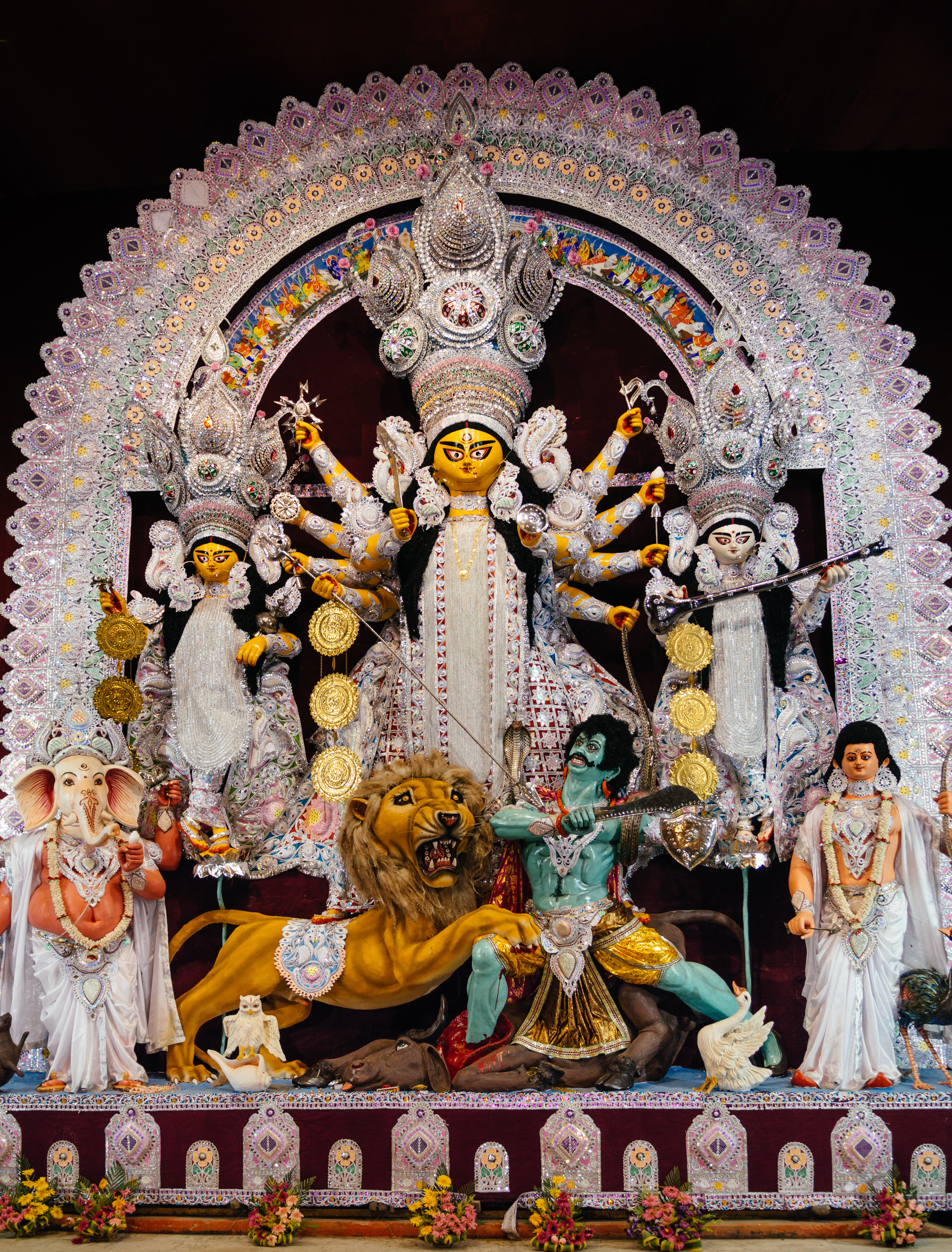
- Durga Puja, the most notable Hindu festival for Bengali Hindus.

Total population
- c. 95-97 million (2026 est.); 78-80 million (2011 & 2022 census)

Regions with significant populations
- India: ~82 million (2026 est.) (Note: The estimated population of India in 2026 is about 1.48 billion, of which approximately 8% are Bengalis. Approximately 70% of them are Bengali Hindus.); 66,700,000–68,200,000 (2011) (Note: including 55,000,000 in West Bengal 6,500,000-7,500,000 in Assam, 3,000,000 in Jharkhand and 2,200,000 in Tripura)
- Bangladesh: ~14-15 million (2026 est.) (Note: Bangladesh’s population is expected to be around 176 million in 2026. Approximately 7.95% of the population follows Hinduism.); 13,130,109 (2022 census)

Religions
- Hinduism (Shaktism, Vaishnavism, Shaivism)

Languages
- Bengali

Related ethnic groups
- Bengali Muslims · Bengali Buddhists · Bengali Christians · Bengali Hindu diaspora · Bengalis in Myanmar · Bengali Americans

Bengali Hindus (Bengali: বাঙালি হিন্দু, romanized: Bāṅgālī Hindu/Banghāli Hindu) are adherents of Hinduism who ethnically, linguistically and genealogically identify as Bengalis. They make up the majority in the Indian states of West Bengal, Tripura, Andaman and Nicobar Islands, and Assam's Barak Valley region and make up the largest minority in Bangladesh. Comprising about one-third of the global Bengali population, they are the largest ethnic group among Hindus. Bengali Hindus speak Bengali, which belongs to the Indo-Aryan language family and adhere to the Shaktism school of thought of Hinduism (majority, the Kalikula tradition) or Vaishnavism (minority, Gaudiya Vaishnavism and Vaishnava-Sahajiya) of their native religion Hinduism with some regional deities. There are significant numbers of Bengali-speaking Hindus in different Indian states.

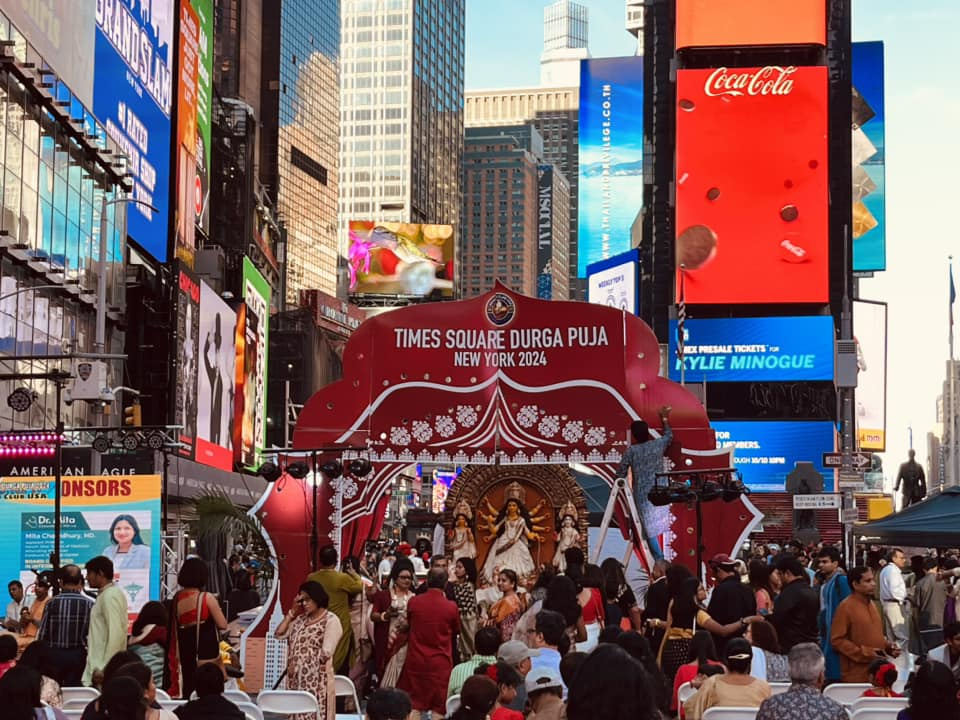
Durga Puja celebrations at Times Square by Bengali Hindu Americans

Around the 8th century, the Bengali language branched off from Magadhi Prakrit, a derivative of Sanskrit that was prevalent in the eastern region of the Indian subcontinent at that time. During the Sena period (11th – 12th century) the Bengali culture developed into a distinct culture, within the civilisation. Bengali Hindus and Muslims were at the forefront of the Bengal Renaissance in the 19th century; the Bengal region was noted for its participation in the struggle for independence from the British rule.

At the time of the independence of India in 1947, the province of Bengal was partitioned between India and East Pakistan, part of the Muslim-majority state of Pakistan. Millions of Bengali Hindus numbering around 2,519,557 (1941–1951) have migrated from East Bengal (later Bangladesh) and settled in West Bengal and other states of India. The migration continued in waves through the fifties and sixties, especially as a results of the 1950 East Pakistan riots, which led to the migration of 4.5 million Hindus to India, according to one estimate. The massacre of East Pakistanis in the Bangladesh Liberation War of 1971 led to exodus of millions of Hindus to India.

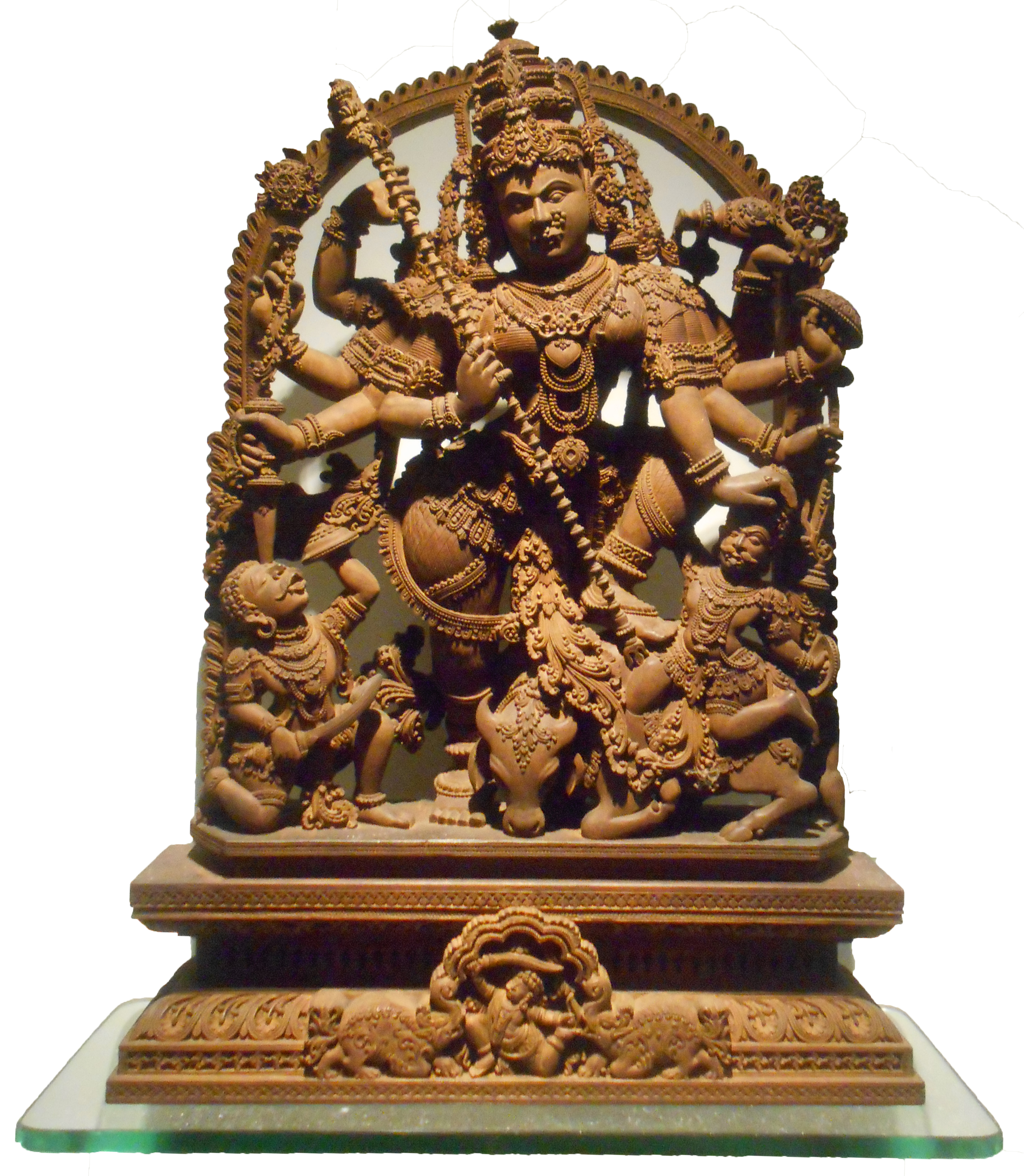
Sandalwood sculpture of Durga, Indian Museum, Kolkata.

== Ethnonym ==
The Hindus are a religious group, native to the Indian subcontinent, speaking a broad range of Indo-Aryan and Dravidian languages and adhering to the native belief systems, rooted in the Vedas. The word Hindu is popularly believed to be a Persian exonym for the people native to the Indian subcontinent. The word is derived from Sindhu, the Sanskrit name for the river Indus and it initially referred to the people residing to the east of the river. The Hindus are constituted into various ethno-linguistic subgroups, which in spite of being culturally diverse, share a common bond of unity.

The word Bengali is derived from the Bengali word bangali. The English word Bengali denoting the people as well as the language is derived from the English word Bengal denoting the region, which itself is derived ultimately from the Bengali word Vanga which was one of the five historical kingdoms of Eastern India. According to Harivamsa, Bali, the king of the asuras had five sons from his wife Sudeshna through sage Dirghatama. The five sons namely Anga, Vanga, Kalinga, Pundra and Sumha went on to found five kingdoms of the same name in the eastern region of the Indian subcontinent. In ancient times Vanga proper consisted of the deltaic region between Bhagirathi, Padma and Madhumati, but later on extended to include the regions which now roughly comprise Bangladesh and the Indian state of West Bengal.

In India, they tend to identify themselves as Bengalis while in Bangladesh they tend to identify themselves as Hindus. In the global context, the terms Indian Bengali and Bangladeshi Hindu are respectively used. In India, Bengali generally refers to Bengali Hindus, excluding a significant number of Bengali Muslims who are also ethnically Bengalis. The 'other' is usually identified as 'non-Bengali', a term that generically refers to the Hindu people who are not Bengali speaking, but sometimes specifically used to denote the Hindi speaking population.

== Ethnology ==
The Bengali Hindus constitute of numerous endogamous castes, which are sometimes further subdivided into endogamous subgroups. The caste system evolved over centuries and became more and more complex with time. In the medieval period, several castes were boycotted by the ruling classes from time to time and this isolation continued till the 19th century. These social boycotts were somewhat discriminatory in nature. After the Renaissance, the rigidity of the caste system ceased to a great extent, so much so that the first celebrated intercaste marriage took place as early as in 1925.

The Bengali Hindu families are patriarchal as well as patrilocal and traditionally follow a joint family system. However, due to the Partition and subsequent urbanisation, the joint families have given way to the nuclear families. The Bengali Hindus were traditionally governed by the Dāyabhāga school of law, as opposed to the Mitākṣarā school of law, which governed the other Hindu ethno-linguistic groups. In India, after the promulgation of the Hindu code bills, the Bengali Hindus along with other Hindus are being governed by a uniform Hindu law.

There are two major social subgroups among the Bengali Hindus – the ghotis and the bangals. The Bengali Hindus who emigrated from East Bengal (Bangladesh) at the wake of the Partition and settled in West Bengal, came to known as the bangals, while the native Bengali Hindus of West Bengal came to known as ghotis. For several decades after partition, these two social subgroups possessed marked difference in their accents and their rivalry was manifested in many spheres of life, most notably in the support for the football clubs of East Bengal and Mohun Bagan respectively. Several such differences have eased with passing years.

== History ==
=== Prehistoric period ===
20,000-year-old stone weapons including small axes, potteries and charcoal remains have been unearthed from Chandthakurer Danga in Haatpara mouza, 8 km northeast of Sagardighi in Murshidabad. Microliths dating to 10000 BC has been excavated from Birbhanpur, situated in Paschim Bardhaman district on the Damodar River valley near Durgapur. Microliths, potteries, copper fishhooks and iron arrowheads have been found at Pandu Rajar Dhibi.

=== Ancient period ===
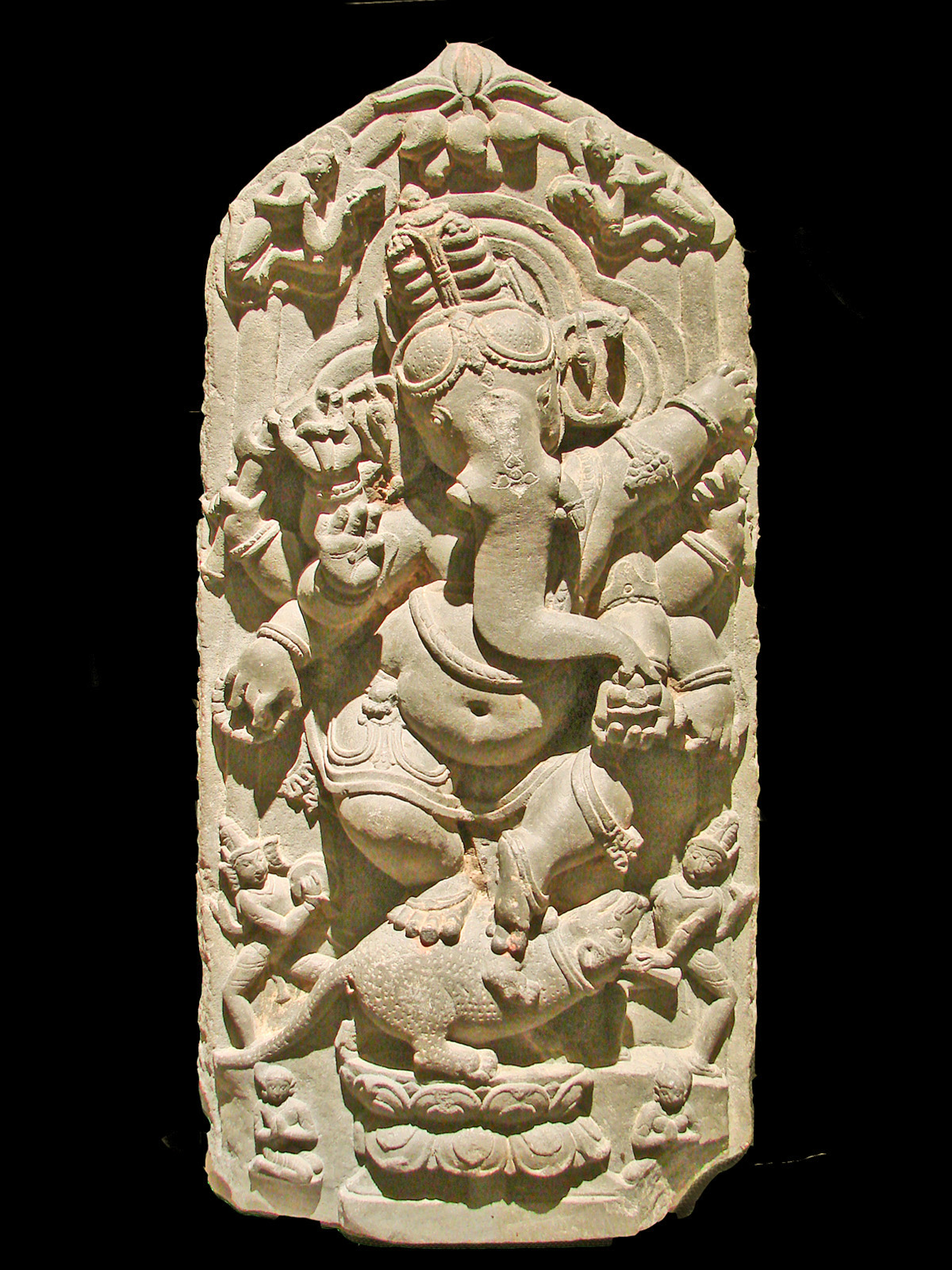
Dancing Ganesha sculpture from North Bengal, 11th century CE, Asian Art Museum of Berlin (Dahlem).

In the ancient times, some of the Bengali Hindus were seafaring people as evident from the tales of merchants like Chand Sadagar and Dhanapati Saudagor whose ships sailed to far off places for trade and establishment of colonies in South East Asia. By the 3rd century BCE they were united into a powerful state, known to the Greeks as Gangaridai, whose military prowess demoralised Alexander from further expedition to the east.

=== Medieval period ===
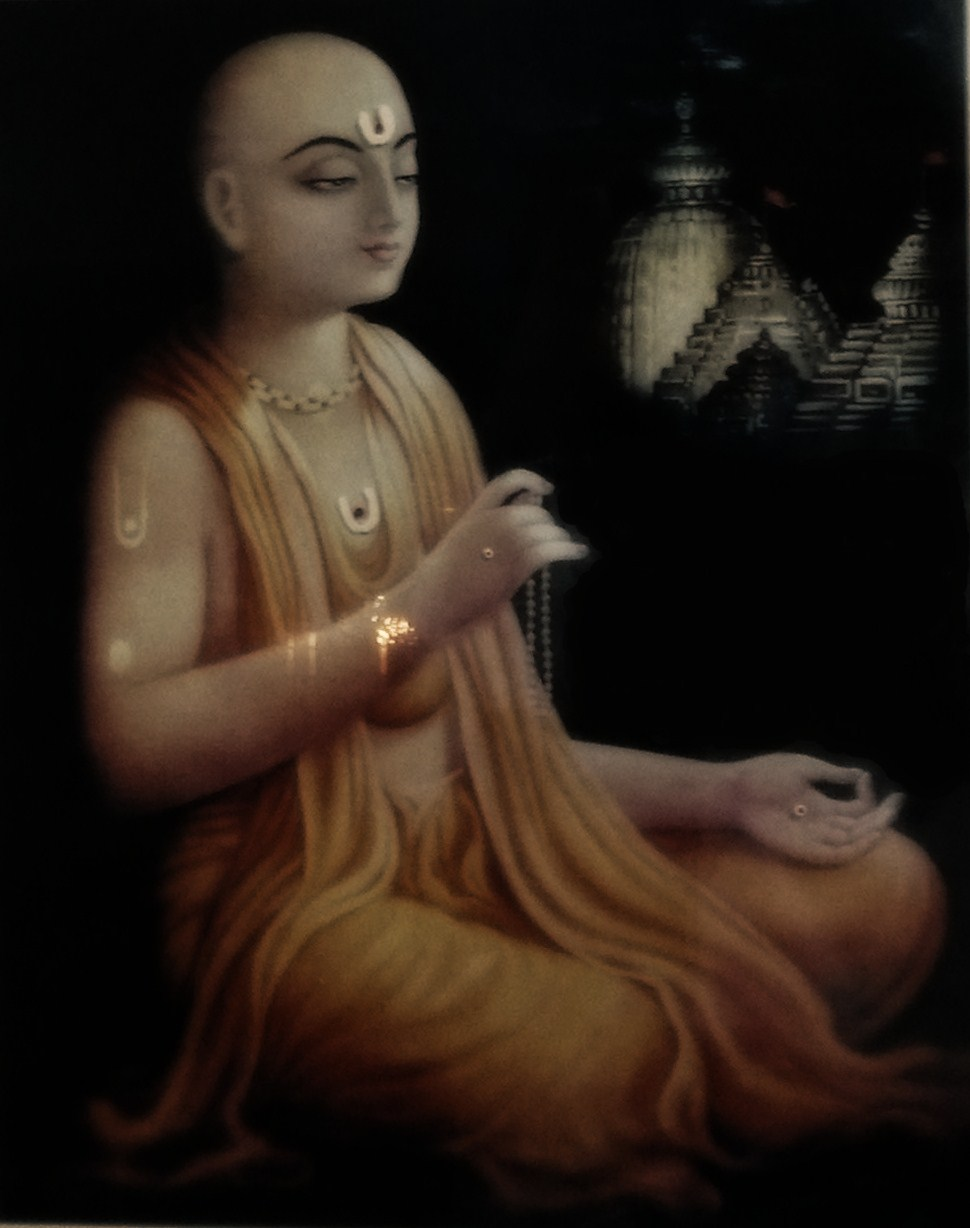
Chaitanya Mahaprabhu, the founder of Gaudiya Vaishnavism

In the middle of the 8th century, the Bengali Hindu nobility democratically elected Gopala as the ruler of Gauda, ushering in an era of peace and prosperity in Bengal, ending almost a century of chaos and confusion. The Buddhist Pala rulers unified Bengal into a single political entity and expanded it into an empire, conquering a major portion of North India. During this time, the Bengali Hindus excelled in art, literature, philosophy, mathematics, sciences and statecraft. The first scriptures in Bengali Charyapada was composed during the Pala rule. The Pala were followed by the Senas who made far reaching changes in the social structure of Bengali Hindus, introducing 36 new castes and orthodox institutions like Kulinism.

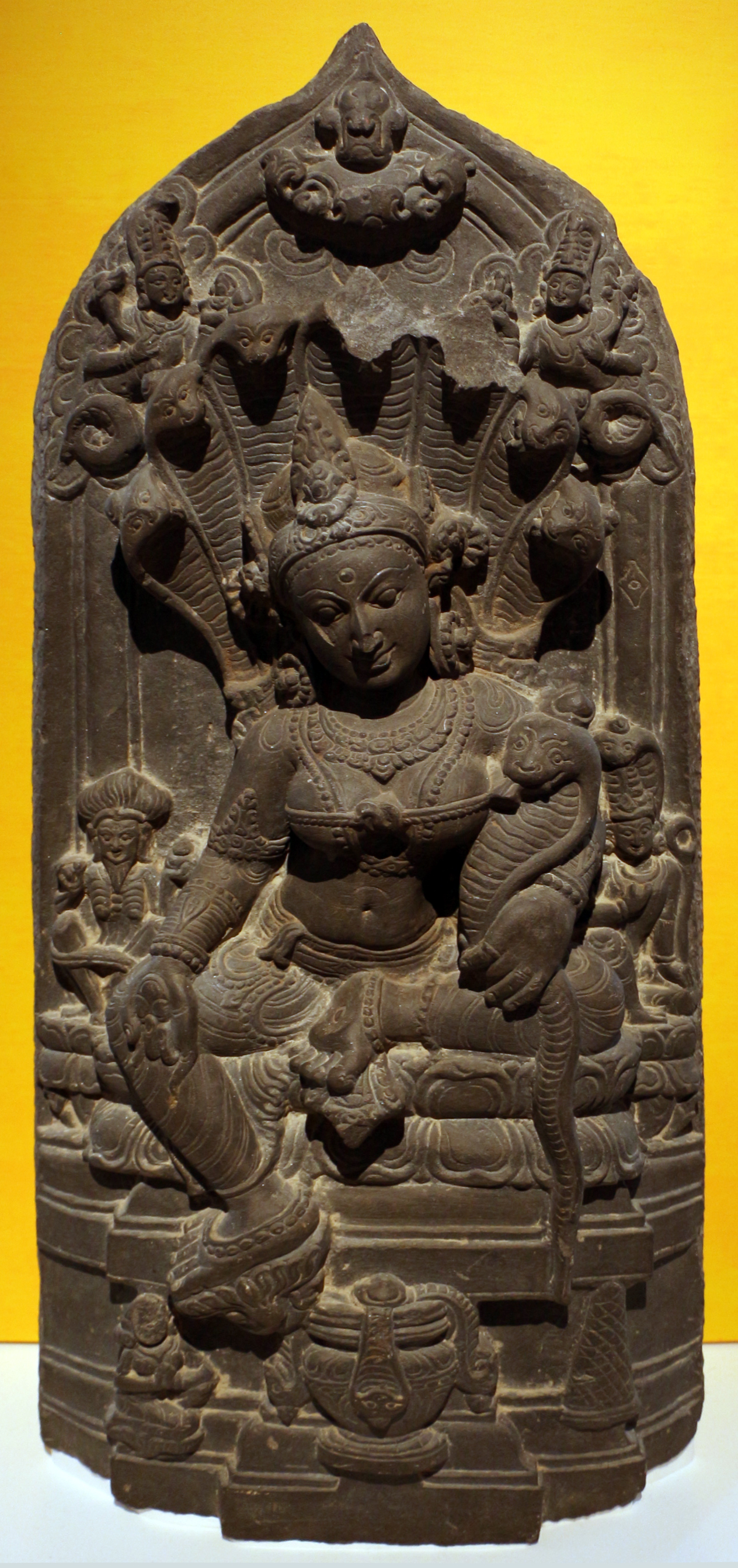
Devi Manasa with her husband Jaratkaru and son Astik flanked by Nagas, 11th century Pala period statue from Bengal

The literary progress of the Pala and Sena period came to a halt after the Turkish conquest in the early 13th century. Except for Haridas Datta's Manasar Bhasan no significant literary work was composed for about a century after the conquest. Even though the ruling classes resisted the invaders, Gauda, the centre of Bengal polity, fell to the Islamic invaders. During this period hundreds of temples and monasteries were desecrated. The next attack on the society came from the Islamic missionaries. Local chieftains like Akananda, Dakshin Ray and Mukut Ray, resisted the missionary activities.

During the Pathan occupation of Bengal, some regions were held in sway by different Bengali Hindu rulers. Islam religion gradually spread throughout the Bengal region, and many Bengali Hindus converted to Islam. When the Delhi-based Mughals tried to bring Bengal under their direct rule, the Bengali chiefs along with some Bengali Muslims consolidated themselves into confederacies and resisted the Mughals. After the fall of the confederacies, the Mughals brought a major part of Bengal under their control, and constituted a subah.

=== Early modern period ===
During the decline of the Mughal Empire, Nawabs of Bengal (who were Muslim) ruled a large part of Bengal. During the reign of Alivardi Khan. a Nawab, the severe taxation and frequent Maratha raids made the life miserable for the ordinary Bengali Hindus. A section of the Bengali Hindu nobility helped the British East India Company in overthrowing the Nawab Siraj ud-Daulah regime. After obtaining the revenue rights, the East India Company imposed more oppressive taxation. In the famine of 1770, approximately one third of the Bengali population died.

The British began to face stiff resistance in conquering the semi-independent Bengali Hindu kingdoms outside the pale of Muslim occupied Bengal. In some cases, even when their rulers have been captured or killed, the ordinary people began to carry on the fight. These resistances took the form of Chuar (Chuar is a derogatory term used by the Britishers and local zamindars to denote the Bhumij peoples) and Paik Rebellion. These warring people were later listed as criminal tribes and barred from recruitment in the Indian army. In 1766, the British troops were completely routed by the sanyasis and fakirs or the warrior monks at Dinhata, where the latter resorted guerrilla warfare. Bankim Chandra's Anandamath is based on the Famine and consequential Sannyasi Rebellion.

=== British rule ===
According to author James Jeremiah Novak, as British rulers took power from Bengal's ruling Muslim class, they strategically catered to Bengali Hindus. The British rule destroyed the bases of Bengali Muslim society. Bengali Hindus got favours from the British rulers, and experienced development in education and social mobility. In the 19th century, the elite class of Bengali Hindu people underwent radical social reforms and rapid modernisation; the phenomenon came to be known as the Bengal Renaissance.

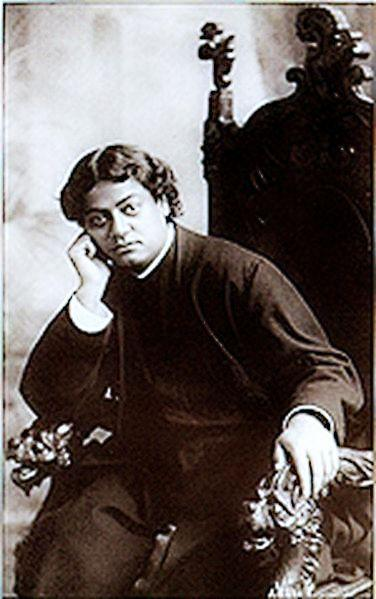
Swami Vivekananda was a leading figure of the Bengal Renaissance Vivekananda at the Parliament of the World's Religions (1893)

Public media like press and theatres became vents of nationalist sentiments, apolitical organisations had given way to political platforms, secret revolutionary societies emerged and the society at large became restive.

With rising nationalism among Bengali Hindus, the British rulers started to favour Bengali Muslims. To keep the rising Bengali Hindu aspirations at bay, the British applied divide and rule, and partitioned the province in 1905 and along with some additional restructuring came up with two provinces – Eastern Bengal & Assam and Bengal itself, in each of which the Bengali Hindus were reduced to minorities. The Bengalis, however, opposed to the Partition tooth and nail, embarked on a political movement of Swadeshi, boycott and revolutionary nationalism. On 28 September 1905, the day of Mahalaya, 50,000 Bengali Hindus resolved before the Mother at Kalighat to boycott foreign goods and stop employing foreigners. The British Raj finally annulled the Partition in 1911. The Raj, however, carried out some restructuring, and carved out Bengali Hindu majority districts like Manbhum, Singbhum, Santal Pargana and Purnia awarding them to Bihar and others like Cachar that were awarded to Assam, which effectively made the Bengali Hindus a minority in the united province of Bengal. The Britishers also transferred the capital from Calcutta to New Delhi.

The revolutionary movement gained momentum after the Partition. Bengali revolutionaries collaborated with the Germans during the War to liberate British India. Later the revolutionaries defeated the British army in the Battle of Jalalabad and liberated Chittagong. During the Quit India Movement, the revolutionaries liberated the Tamluk and Contai subdivision of Midnapore district from British rule and established the Tamralipta National Government.

The British, unable to control the revolutionary activities, decided to hinder the Bengali Hindu people through administrative reforms. The Government of India Act 1919 introduced in the 144 member Bengal Legislative Assembly, 46 seats for the Muslims, 59 for the institutions, Europeans and others and left the rest 39 as General, (Note: There were no separate electorates for Hindus, in spite of them being minorities in the province.) where the Bengali Hindus were to scramble for a representation. The situation worsened with the Communal Award of 1932, where in the 250 member Bengal Legislative Assembly a disproportionate 119 seats were reserved for the Muslims, 17 for Europeans, Anglo-Indians and Indian Christians, 34 for the institutions, and the rest 80 were left as General. The Communal Award further divided the Hindus into Scheduled Caste Hindus and Tribal Hindus. Out of the 80 General seats, 10 were reserved for the Scheduled Castes. (Note: The Caste Hindus were supposed to contest in the 70 General seats. However as per the Poona Pact between Gandhi and Ambedkar, 20 General seats were reserved for Scheduled Castes.) In response the leading Bengali Hindu landholders, lawyers and professionals signed the Bengal Hindu Manifesto on 23 April 1932 rejecting the justification of reservation of separate electorates for Muslims in the Bengal Legislative Assembly. They joined hands with Sikhs and non-Bengali Hindus in attacking Muslims and ultimately it turned out to be a violent reprisal that resulted in heavy casualties of Muslims, finally forcing the government to stop the mayhem. Later in the year, the Muslim League government orchestrated the infamous Noakhali genocide.

After the failure of the United Bengal plan, it became evident that either all of Bengal would go to Pakistan, or it would be partitioned between India and Pakistan. Direct Action Day and the Noakhali genocide prompted the Bengali Hindu leadership to vote for the Partition of Bengal to create a Hindu-majority province. In late April 1947, the Amrita Bazar Patrika published the results of an opinion poll, in which 98% of the Bengali Hindus favoured the creation of a separate homeland. The proposal for the Partition of Bengal was moved in the Legislative Assembly on 20 June 1947, where the Hindu members voted 58–21 in favour of the Partition with two members abstaining. (Note: Rup Narayan Roy and Jyoti Basu, the two Communist Party MLAs abstained.)

The Boundary Commission implementing the Radcliffe Line announced that the Khulna District (with a marginal Hindu majority of 51%) would be given to East Pakistan in lieu of the Murshidabad district (with a 70% Muslim majority) to be went to India.

=== Post-partition period ===
After the Partition, the majority of the urban upper class and middle class Bengali Hindu population of East Bengal immigrated to West Bengal. The ones who stayed back were the ones who had significant landed property and believed that they will be able to live peacefully in an Islamic state. However, after the genocide of 1950, Bengali Hindus fled East Bengal in thousands and settled in West Bengal. In 1964, tens of thousands of Bengali Hindus were massacred in East Pakistan and most of the Bengali Hindu owned businesses and properties of Dhaka were permanently destroyed. During the Bangladesh Liberation War, large number of Bengali Hindus were massacred. The Enemy Property Act of the Pakistan regime which is still in force in the new incarnation of Vested Property Act, has been used by successive Bangladeshi governments to seize the properties of the Hindu minorities who left the country during the Partition of India and Bangladesh liberation war. According to Professor Abul Barkat of Dhaka University, the Act has been used to misappropriate 2,100,000 acres (8,500 km^{2}) of land from the Bengali Hindus, roughly equivalent to the 45% of the total landed area owned by them.

In Assam's, Assamese dominated Brahmaputra Valley region Bongal Kheda movement (which literally means drive out Bengalis) was happened in the late 1948-80s, where several thousands of Hindu Bengalis was massacred by jingoists Assamese nationalists mob in various parts of Assam and as a result of this jingoist movement, nearly 500,000 Bengali Hindus were forced to flee from Assam to take shelter in neighbouring West Bengal particularly in Jalpaiguri division in seek for safety. In the Bengali dominated Barak Valley region of Assam, violence broke out in 1960 and 1961 between Bengali Hindus and ethnic Assamese police over a state bill which would have made Assamese mandatory in the secondary education curriculum. On 19 May 1961, eleven Bengali protesters were killed by Assamese police fired on a demonstration at the Silchar railway station. Subsequently, the Assam government allowed Bengali as the medium of education and held it as an official position in Barak Valley. The United Liberation Front of Asom, National Democratic Front of Bodoland, Muslim United Liberation Tigers of Assam and National Liberation Front of Tripura militants have selectively targeted the Bengali Hindu people, prompting the latter to form the Bengali Tiger Force.

Discrimination against refugee Bengali Hindu population is not limited to the North East. In Odisha, in a family of ten individuals, only half of them has been recognised as Indians while the rest were branded as Bangladeshis.

The Bengali refugees who had settled in Bihar after the partition of India are denied land owning rights, caste certificates and welfare schemes. However, the Nitish Kumar government had promised to solve this problems and also to raise the status of Bangla as a language in the state.

== Geographic distribution ==
Bengali Hindus constitute a minority ethnic group of the total population in both Bangladesh and India, forming less than 10% of the population in both countries.

=== West Bengal ===
Hinduism has existed in Bengal before the 16th century BC and by the third century, Buddhism has also gain popularity in Bengal. West Bengal was created in 1947 as an act of Bengali Hindu Homeland Movement to save guard the political, economical, cultural, religious, demographic and land owning rights of Bengali Hindus of undivided Bengal region and as a result predominantly Hindu majority West Bengal became a part of Indian union. The vast majority of Hindus in West Bengal are Bengali Hindus numbering around 55 million out of the total estimated state population of 100 million, but a notable section of non-Bengali Hindus also exist, particularly among Marwaris, Biharis, Odias, Gurkhas, Punjabis, Sindhis, Gujaratis and various tribal communities such as Koch-Rajbongshi, Santals, Munda and particularly Adivasis numbering around 15.57 million comprising 15% of the state population.

=== Bangladesh ===
Hinduism has existed in what is now called Bangladesh since the ancient times. In nature, the Bangladeshi Hinduism closely resembles the ritual and customs of Hinduism practised in the Indian state of West Bengal, with which Bangladesh (at one time known as East Bengal) was united until the partition of India. While in Bangladesh, Bengali Hindus are the second largest community with a population of 12.8 million out of 149.77 million people constituting (8.5%) of the country as per 2011 year census. But distinct Hindu population also exist among indigenous tribes like Garo, Khasi, Jaintia, Santhal, Bishnupriya Manipuri, Tripuri, Munda, Oraon, Dhanuk etc. In terms of population, Bangladesh is the third largest Hindu populated country in the world after India and Nepal.

Out of 21 million population of Dhaka as far estimated by 2020, Bengali Hindus are at present the second largest community just after Bengali Muslims in Dhaka numbering around at 1,051,167 (5% of population) and are mainly concentrated in Shankhari Bazaar.

=== Indian States other than West Bengal ===
==== Assam ====
The Barak Valley comprising the present districts of Cachar, Karimganj and Hailakandi is contiguous to Sylhet (Bengal plains), where the Bengali Hindus, according to historian J.B. Bhattacharjee, had settled well before the colonial period, influencing the culture of Dimasa Kacharis. Bhattacharjee describes that the Dimasa kings spoke Bengali and the inscriptions and coins written were in Bengali script. Migrations to Cachar increased after the British annexation of the region. The Bengalis have been living in Barak Valley for at least 1,500 years, settling there much earlier than the Koch, Dimasa and the Tripuris. The Koches settled in Barak Valley in the 16th century, while the Dimasas settled in the late 16th - early 17th century A.D respectively. Bengali Hindus first came into Assam's Brahmaputra Valley during the time of British era of 1826 from neighbouring Bengal region as colonial official workers, bankers, railway employees, bureaucrats and later on during the time Partition of Bengal in 1947. Between the period of first patches (1946–1951), around 274,455 Bengali Hindu refugees have arrived from what is now called Bangladesh (former East Pakistan) in various locations of Assam as permanent settlers and again in second patches between (1952–1958) of the same decade, around 212,545 Bengali Hindus from Bangladesh took shelter in various parts of the state permanently. After the 1964 East Pakistan riots many Bengali Hindus have poured into Assam as refugees and the number of Hindu migrants in the state rose to 1,068,455 in 1968 (sharply after 4 years of the riot). The fourth patches numbering around 347,555 have just arrived after Bangladesh liberation war of 1971 as refugees and most of them being Bengali speaking Hindus have decided to stay back in Assam permanently afterwards. Bengali Hindus are now the third largest community in Assam after Assamese people and Bengali Muslims with a population of 6,022,677 (million), comprising (19.3%) of state population as of 2011 census. They are highly concentrated in the Barak Valley region where they a form a slide majority and the population of Bengali Hindus in Barak Valley is 2 million, constituting 55% of the total population of the region. In Assam's Brahmaputra Valley region, their numbers are 4 million covering up 14.5% of the valley population respectively and are mainly concentrated in Hojai District where Bengali are spoken by (53%) of the district population, Goalpara District, Nagaon district, Bongaigaon district, Barpeta District, Kamrup District, Darrang district, Dhubri District, Morigaon district, Tinsukia district, Karbi Anglong, Guwahati, Bodoland, Dibrugarh district, Jorhat district, Sonitpur district with percentage ranging 15-25% in all those districts mentioned above.

In January 2019, the Leftist organisation Krishak Mukti Sangram Samiti (KMSS) claimed that there are around 2 million Hindu Bangladeshis in Assam who would become Indian citizens if the Citizenship (Amendment) Bill is passed. BJP, however claimed that only eight lakh Hindu Bangladeshis will get citizenship. The number of Hindu immigrants from Bangladesh in Barak Valley has varied estimates. According to the Assam government, 1.3 lakh such people residing in the Barak Valley are eligible for citizenship if the Citizenship Amendment Act of 2019 becomes a law.

==== Jharkhand ====
Most Bengali Hindus came into Jharkhand during the colonial period, brought up by the British as colonial workers mainly from the western part of Bengal. In Jharkhand, the Bengali Hindu population is over 2.5 million comprising 8.09% but the overall Bengali speaking population are a slight majority there and the percentage of Bengali speakers ranges from 38%–40%.

==== Tripura ====
The non-tribal population of Tripura, the mostly Bengali-speaking Hindus and Muslims, constitute more than two-thirds of the state's population. The resident and the migrant Bengali population benefitted from the culture and language of the royal house of Tripura thanks to embracement of Hinduism and adoption of Bengali as the state language by the Maharajahs of Tripura much before Indian independence. Since the partition of India, many Bengali Hindus have migrated to Tripura as refugees fleeing religious persecution in Muslim-majority East Pakistan, especially after 1949 and this is primarily attributed by the immigration of 610,000 Bengalis — the figure almost equal to the State's total population in 1951 — from East Pakistan (now Bangladesh) between 1947 and 1951. Settlement by Hindu Bengalis increased during the Bangladesh Liberation War of 1971, where around at that time, nearly 1,381,649 Bengalis (mostly Hindus) have came into various parts of Tripura to take refugees and most of them have settled here permanently afterwards. Parts of the state were shelled by the Pakistan Army during the Indo-Pakistani War of 1971. Following the war, the Indian government reorganised the North East region to try to improve control of the international borders – three new states came into existence on 21 January 1972: Meghalaya, Manipur, and Tripura. Before independence, most of the population was indigenous. In Tripura, now Bengali Hindus form a clear majority due to immigration from neighbouring East Pakistan during 1947 and 1971 and as a result Tripura has become a Bengali dominant state with Bangla as its official language along with Kokborok and English. Bengali Hindus comprise nearly 60% of the state population which is around 2.2 million whereas native Tripuris are 30% of the state population which is around 1.2 million as of 2011 census.

==== Andaman and Nicobar islands ====
There is also a significant number of Bengali Hindus residing in the Andaman and Nicobar Islands, estimated approximately 100,000 comprising 26%–28% of the population. Bengali is also the most widely spoken language in the Andaman and Nicobar Islands, despite it lacking official status.

=== Myanmar ===
The Bengali Hindus in Myanmar are present from long back historical times, when they were brought from Bengal region to Arakan region by many Arakanese kings, especially the Brahmins for the worship and teaching purpose in the Pagoda. Then afterwards 1920, most of them start settling to the urban areas and main cities, mainly in Yangon, Mandalay and in urban areas of Rakhine State. In modern times, they have faced persecution which was mainly started after 1962 coup by Ne Win.

=== Outside Indian subcontinent ===
Both the United States and United Kingdom have large immigrant Bengali Hindu populations, who are mostly from the professional classes and have migrated through education and employment. Former Cricketer Isa Guha and Rhona Mitra are prominent descendants of the Bengali Hindu diaspora.

== Culture ==
=== Cuisine ===
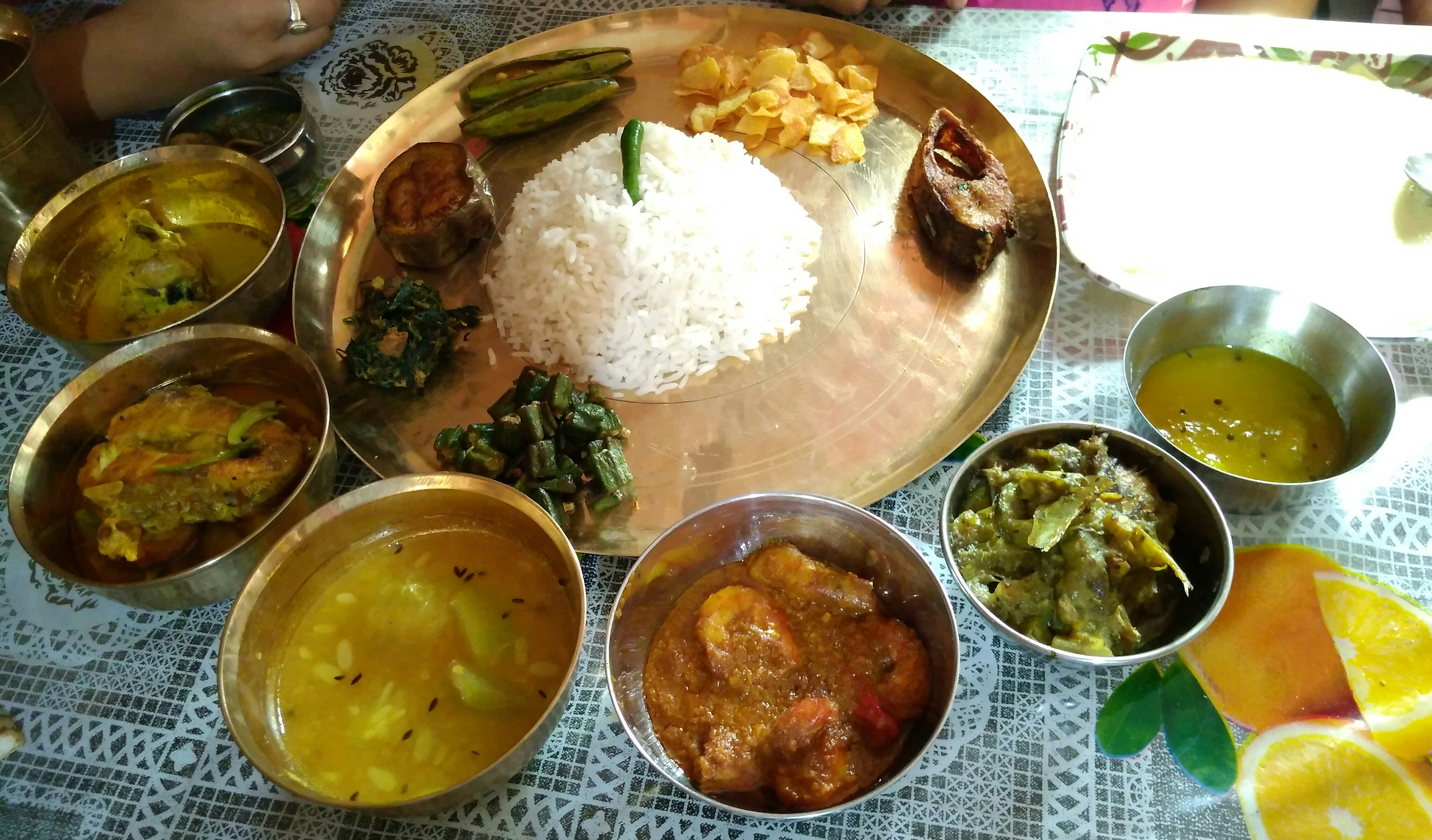
Signature dish of Bengali: Fish And Rice.

Bengali cuisine is mainly influenced by the diet habits similar to the Hindus and includes a very large variety of sweets and dishes. The Bengali sweets includes desserts made by milk, includes Rasgulla, Sandesh, Cham cham, etc. In Hinduism, the consumption of meat is often avoided in diets due to the Hindu principle of ahimsa which prohibits meat consumption. However, Bengali Hindus adore eating meat of goat, chicken, duck and lamb. Most of the Hindus refrain from eating beef. Meat, especially beef is readily consumed in Bangladesh and where it is considered the meal's main course and the Fish curry (or Machher Jhol) with rice is considered as one of the most staple food by both Hindus and Muslims in Bengal.

=== Society ===
Bengali Hindu society used to be caste-oriented throughout centuries and the professional status of men depended exclusively on the hierarchical caste divisions. In traditional Bengali Hindu society, nearly every occupation is carried on by a ranked hierarchy of specialised caste groups such as weaving, pottery, carpentry and blacksmithing. However, with the introduction of British rule and appearance of urban civilisation, the former rural agrarian and artisan economy gradually crumbled and gave way to modern middle class economy. However, agriculture, land tenure, farming and fishing form the predominant economic activity in most of the rural area till now. According to the census in 1881, 12.81 per cent of Bengali Hindus belonged to the upper castes, while a 2020 Deccan Herald publication puts the percentage of the upper castes (Brahmins, Kayasthas and Vaidyas) at 15 to 18 per cent of the Hindu population.

=== Literature ===
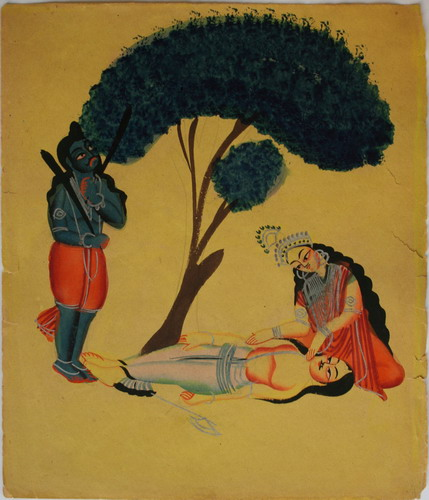
Savitri-Satyavan story on Kalighat Painting, 3rd quarter of the 19th century.

The proper Bengali literary history begins with the early Vaishnava literature like the Shreekrishna Kirtana and the Vaishnava padavalis followed by translation literatures like Ramayana and Srikrishna Vijaya. In the medieval period literary works on the life and teachings of Chaitanya Mahaprabhu were composed. This period saw the emergence of Shakta padavalis. The characteristic feature of Bengali Hindu literature in the middle age are the mangalkavyas, that glorify various Hindu gods and goddesses often using folkloristic backgrounds.

The early modern period saw a flurry in the literary activity especially after the emergence of the Bengali press. The first Bengali prose Raja Pratapaditya Charitra was written during this time. The Renaissance saw a rapid development in modern Bengali literature. Most of the epics, poems, novels, short stories and dramas of the modern classical literature were written during this period. The Bengal Literary Society that later came to be known as Bangiya Sahitya Parishad was founded. Bankim Chandra Chatterjee wrote commentaries on Krishna Charita, Dharmattatva, Bhagavad Gita. The literary development during the Renaissance culminated in Tagore's Nobel Prize for Literature.

In the Post-Partition period, the Bengali Hindus pioneered the Hungry generation, Natun Kabita and the little magazine movements. Of late, some of them have made their mark in contemporary English literature.

=== Art ===
The Kalighat school of painting flourished in Bengal in the early modern period, and especially after the first paper mill was set up in 1809. During the rise of nationalism in the early 20th century, the Bengali Hindus pioneered the Bengal school of art. It provided the artistic medium of expression to the Hindu nationalist movement. Though the Bengal school later gave way to modernist ideas, it left an enduring legacy. In the post-liberalisation phase of India, modern art acquired a new dimension as young artists like Devajyoti Ray, Sudip Roy and Paresh Maity started gaining international recognition. Devajyoti Ray is known for introducing Pseudorealism, which is one of the most original genres of Indian art today.

== Religion ==
The Bengali Hindus generally follow the beliefs and practices that fall under the broad umbrella of Hinduism. Majority of them follow either Shaktism (the Kalikula tradition) or Vaishnavism (Gaudiya Vaishnavism, Vaishnava-Sahajiya, Bauls), and some follow a synthesis of the two. The Shaktas belong to the upper castes as well as lowest castes and tribes, while the lower middle castes are Vaishnavas. The minor traditions include Shaivites. A small minority is atheist who do not follow any rituals. Brahmoism is also found among Bengali Hindus.

A part of the parent tradition, the Bengali Hindus usually affiliate themselves to one of the many sects that have come to be established as institutionalised forms of the ancient guru-shishya traditions. Major amongst them include the Ramakrishna Mission, Bharat Sevashram Sangha, Bijoy Krishna Goswami, Anukul Thakur, Matua, ISKCON, Gaudiya Mission, Ananda Marga, Ram Thakur etc.

The main devis of the Shakta Kalikula tradition are Kali, Chandi, Jagaddhatri, Durga, as well as regional goddesses such as Bishahari and Manasa, the snake goddesses, Shashthi, the protectress of children, Shitala, the smallpox goddess, Annapurna and Umā (the Bengali name for Parvati).

=== Festivals ===
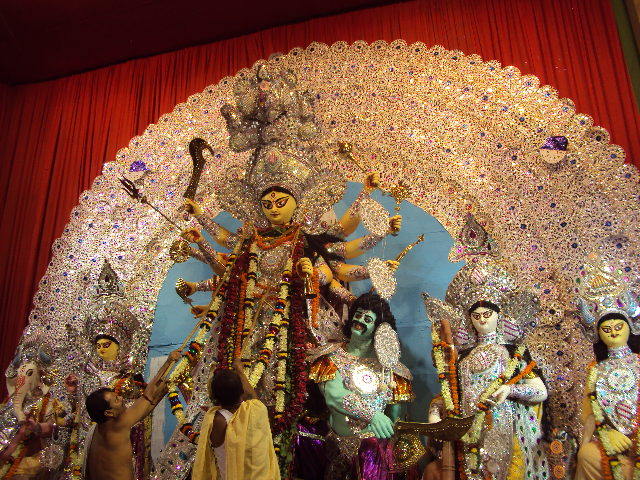
Durga Puja, the largest festival of Bengali Hindus

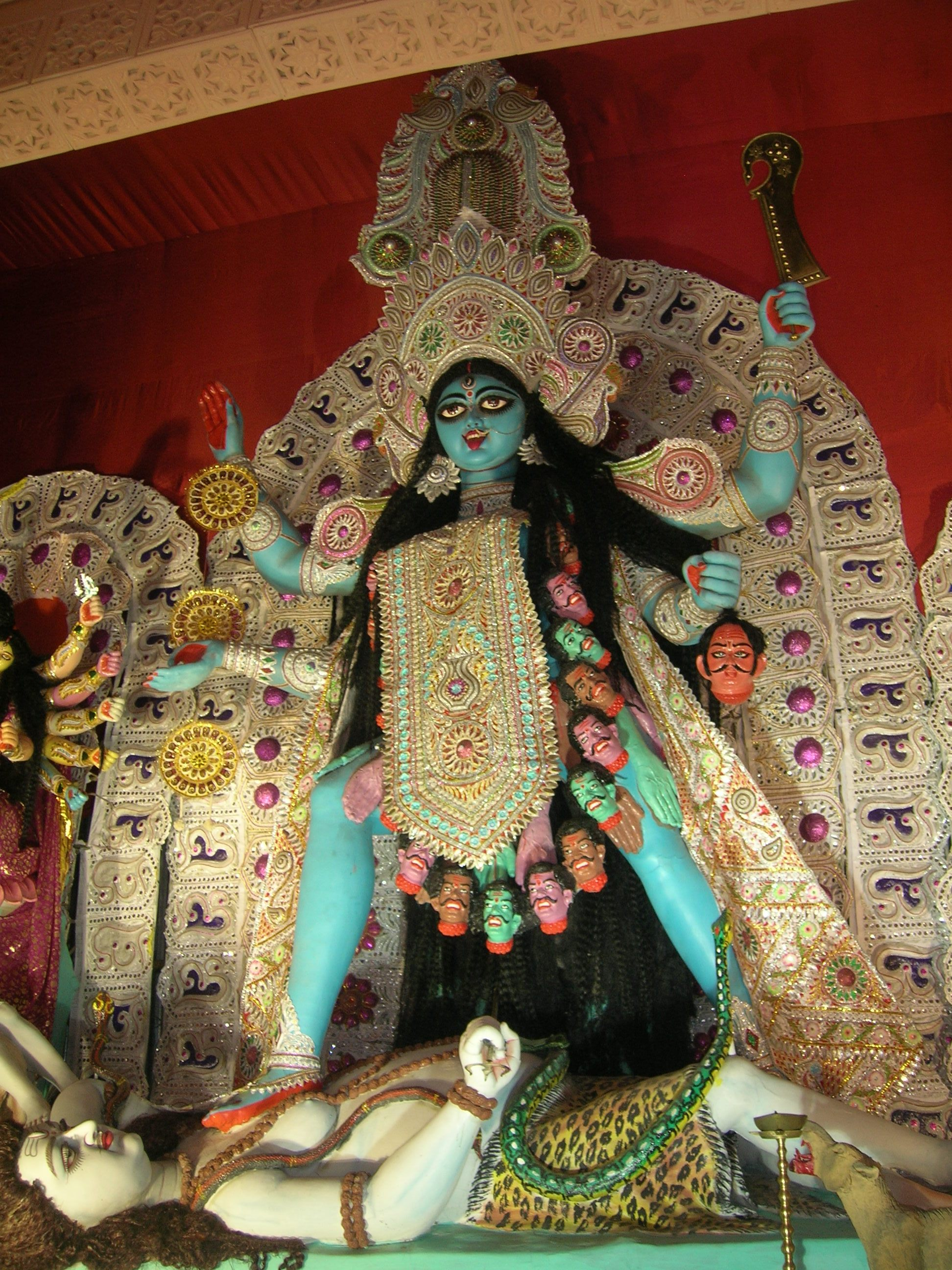
Kali Puja, a major Hindu festival of Bengal

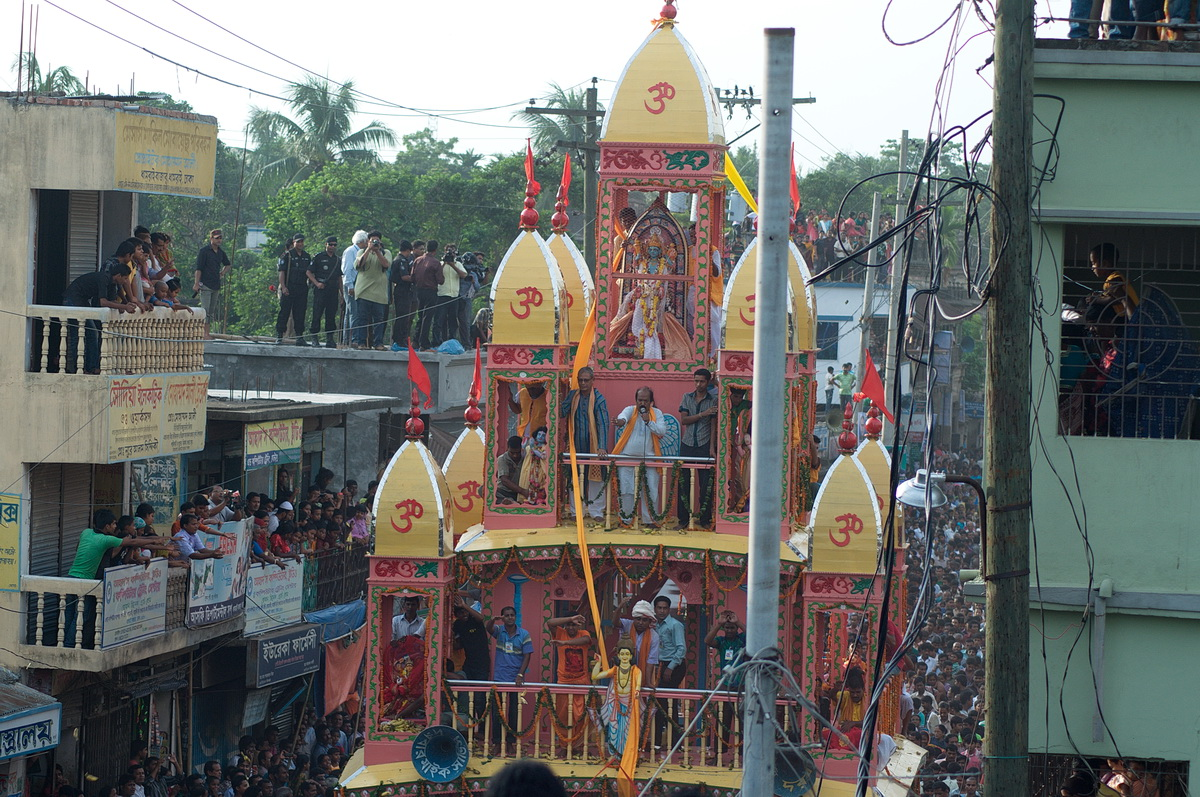
Rath Yatra at Dhamrai in Dhaka district, Bangladesh

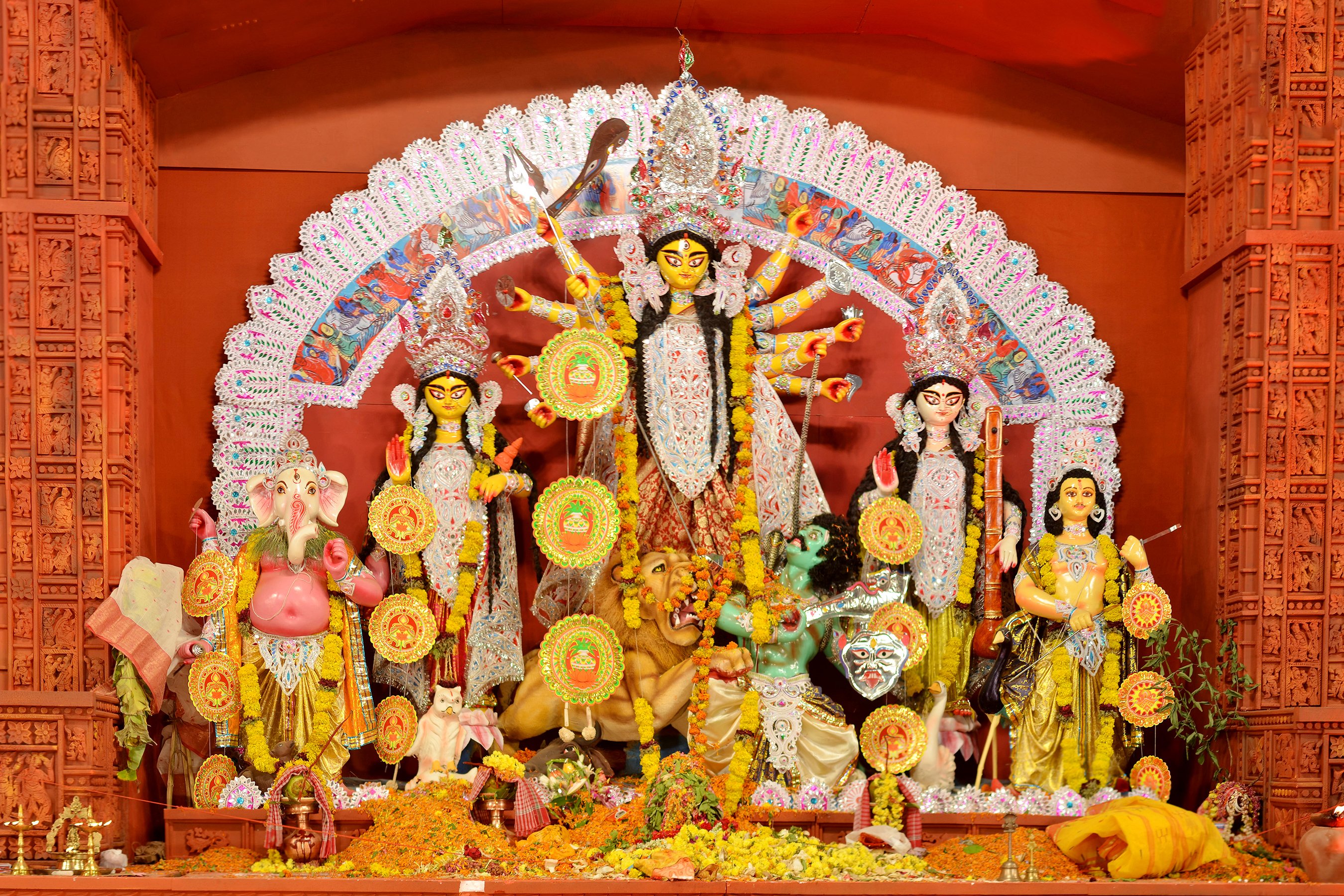
A traditional Durga idol with Chalchitra

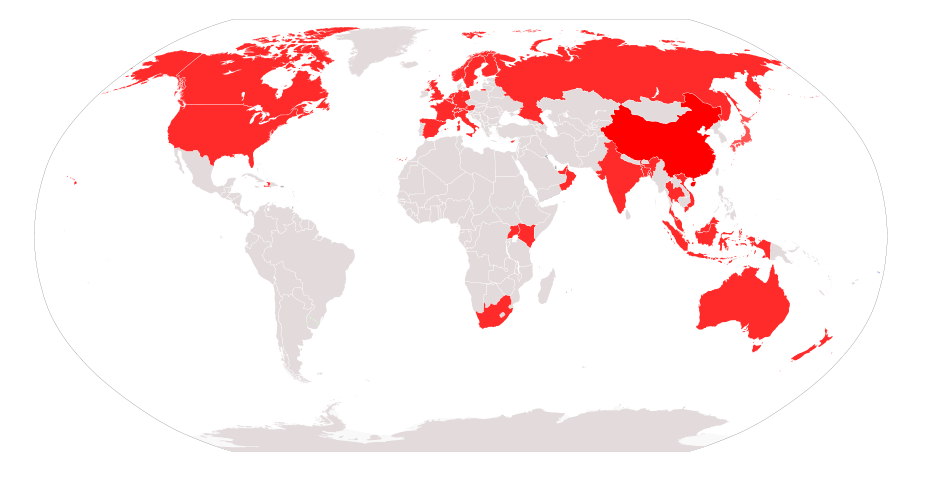
The Bengali Hindu diaspora celebrate Durga Puja all over the world.

According to a famous Bengali proverb, there are thirteen festivals in twelve months (Bengali: বারো মাসে তেরো পার্বণ, romanized: Bārō māsē tērō pārbaṇa). Bengali Hindus celebrate all major Indian festivals. The year begins with the Bengali New Year's Day or Pohela Boishakh which usually falls on 15 April. Traditional business establishment commence their fiscal year on this day, with the worship of Lakshmi and Ganesha and inauguration of the halkhata (ledger). People dress in ethnic wear and enjoy ethnic food. Poila Baishakh is followed by Rabindra Jayanti, Rath Yatra and Janmashtami before the commencement of the Pujas.

The puja season begins with the Vishwakarma Puja and is followed up by Durga Puja—the last four days of Navaratri—the greatest and largest Bengali Hindu festival. It is the commemoration of the victory that teaches none is good and none is evil. Each and every war starts, continues and ends with an objective to fulfill their own minimum demands that is required to exist. The defeated always have to accept the dictations of the victors and the defeated becomes free from the guilt of having defeated in the war and again both victors and defeated become friends. According to Chandi Purana, goddess Durga killed Mahishasura, the demon-like asura and saved the devas. Rama the prince of Ayodhya invoked the blessings of goddess Durga in a battle against Ravana of Lanka. Durga Puja is the commemoration of Goddess Durga's victory over Mahishasura and it ends in Bijoya Dashami. Durga Puja is followed by Kojagari Lakshmi Puja, Kali Puja, Bhai phonta, Jagaddhatri Puja.

The winter solstice is celebrated a Paush Sankranti in mid January, followed by Netaji Jayanti and Saraswati Pooja, a puja dedicated to Goddess of Knowledge and music Goddess Saraswati.

The spring is celebrated in the form of Dolyatra or Holi. The year ends with Charak Puja and Gajan.

Durga Puja became the main religio-cultural celebration within the Bengal diaspora in the West (together with Kali and Saraswati Pujas, if a community is large and prosperous enough).

=== Temples ===
As per David J. McCutchion, historically the religious architecture in Bengal may be divided into three periods: the early Hindu period (up to the end of the 12th century, or maybe a little later in certain areas), the Sultanate period (14th to early 16th century), and the Hindu revival period (16th to 19th century).

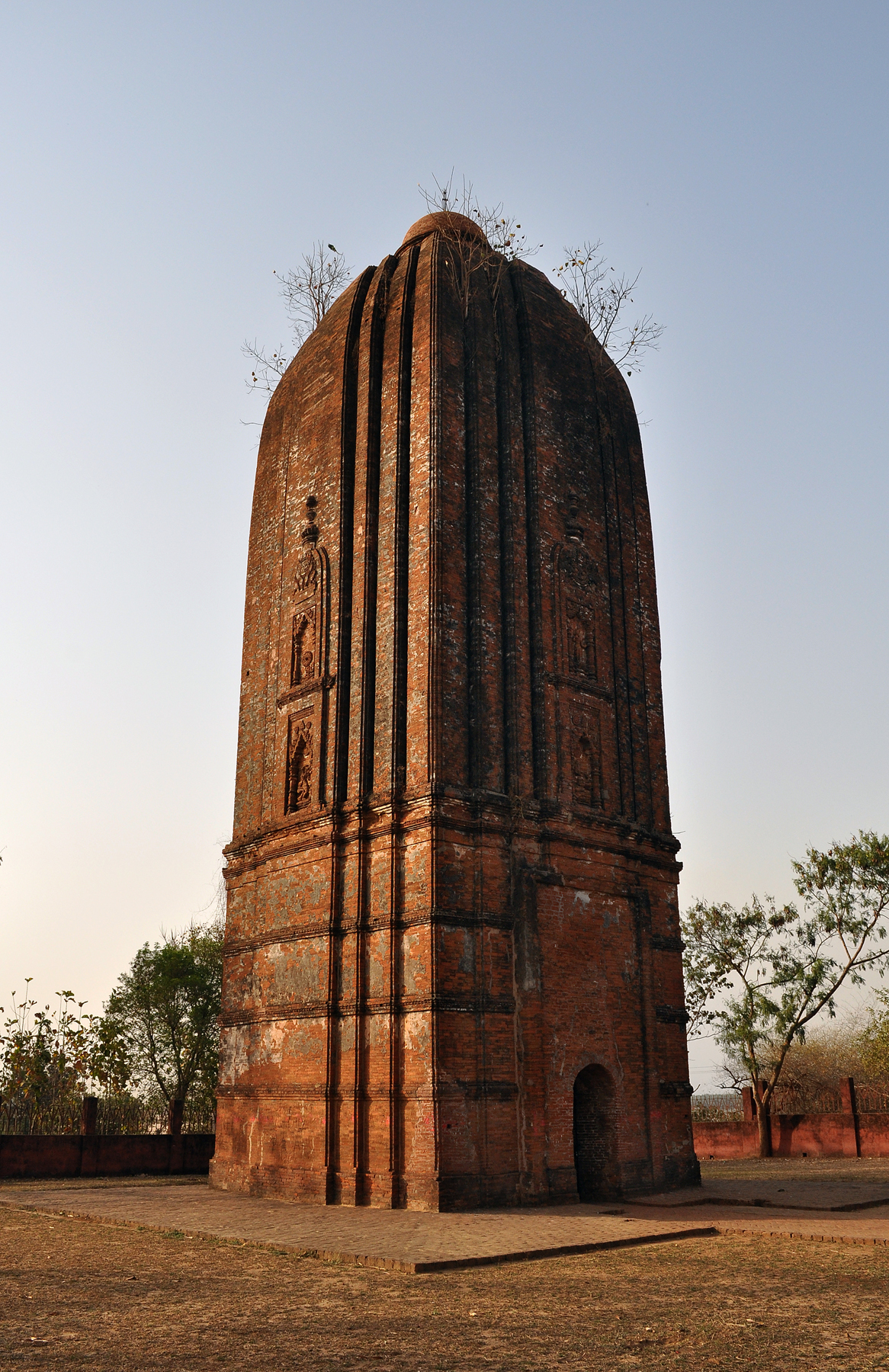
Ichhai Ghosher Deul at Gourangapur in Paschim Bardhaman, West Bengal.

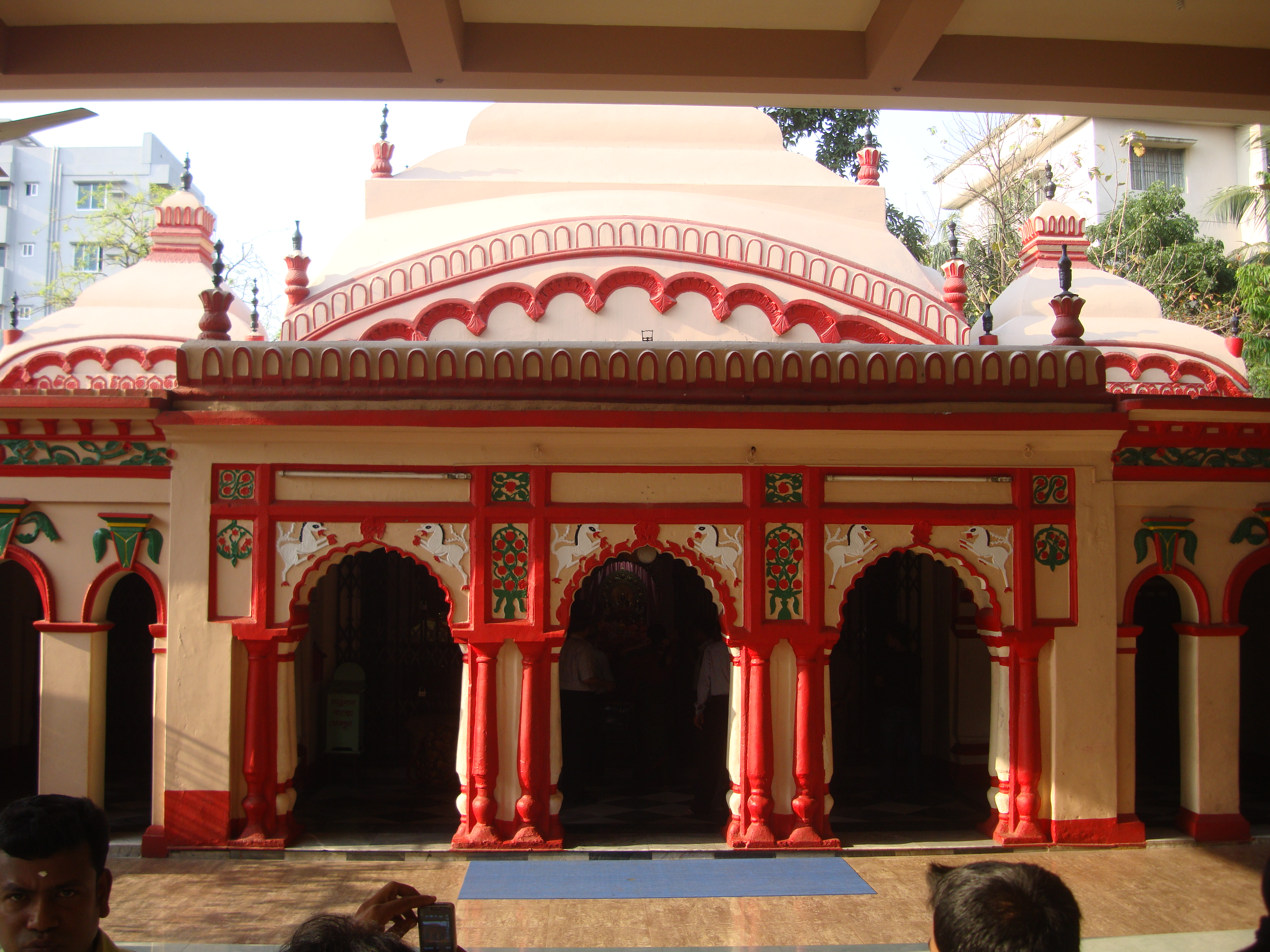
Dhakeshwari Temple in Dhaka.

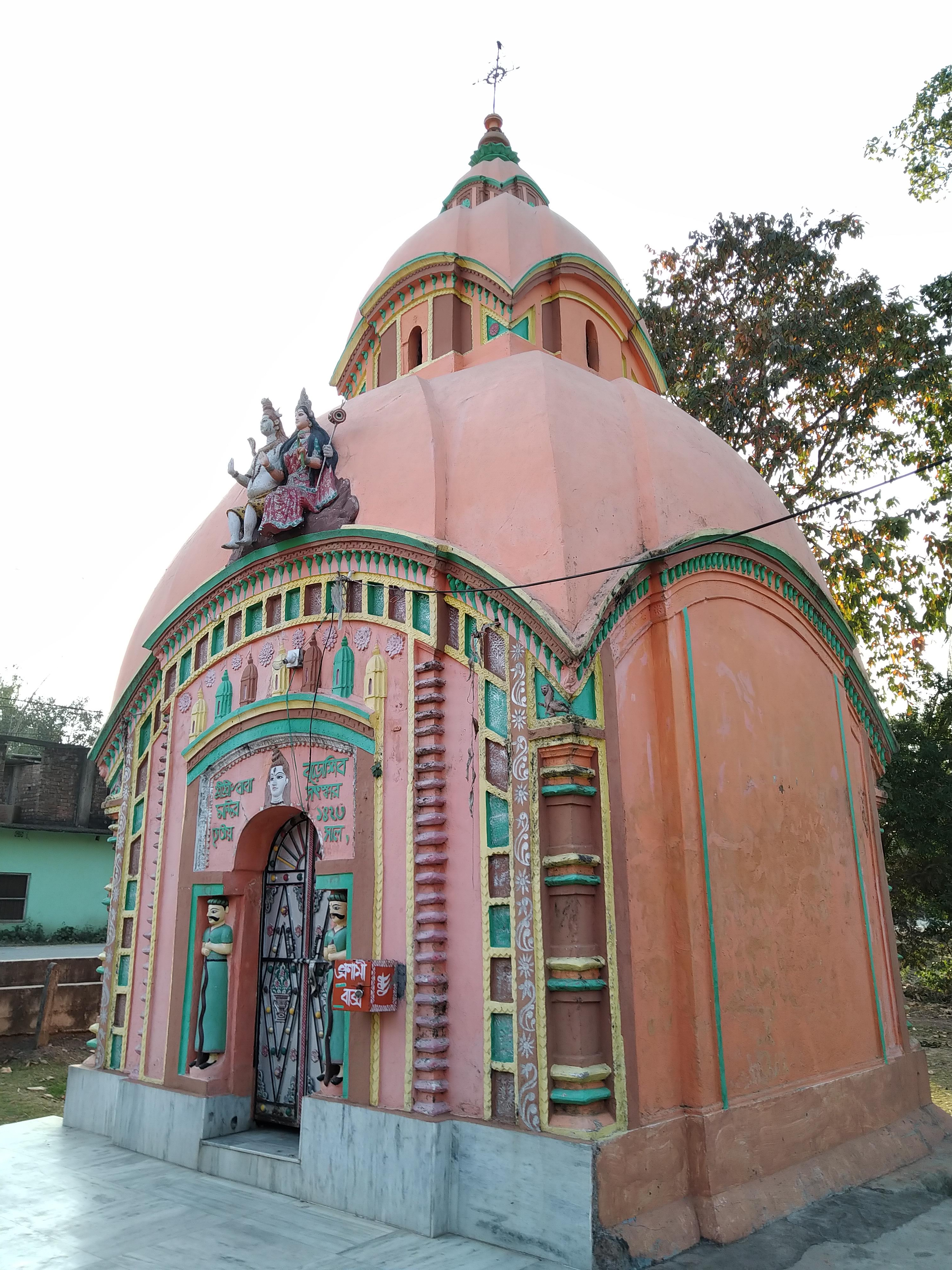
Baro-chala Buro Shiva temple at Jalshara in Paschim Medinipur, West Bengal.

== Businesspeople ==
- Mohit Burman, Dabur
- Amar Bose, Bose Corporation
- Chandra Shekhar Ghosh, Bandhan Bank
- Purnendu Chatterjee
- Aveek Sarkar, ABP Group

== See also ==
- All Assam Bengali Youth Students Federation
- East Bengali refugees
- Hinduism in Bangladesh
- Hinduism in West Bengal
- Bengali Hindus in Tripura
- Bengali Hindus in Assam
- Bengali Hindu diaspora
- Bengali Hindus in Myanmar
- Bengali Hindu Americans
- Bengali Muslims
- Bengali Buddhists
- Bengali Christians
- Bengali Sikhs
- Culture of Bengal
- Culture of West Bengal
- Culture of Bangladesh
