= Bengalis in Tripura =

People of Bengali descent in Tripura, India

ত্রিপুরার বাঙালিরা Tripurār bāṅgālirā Tripura ni bangali rok
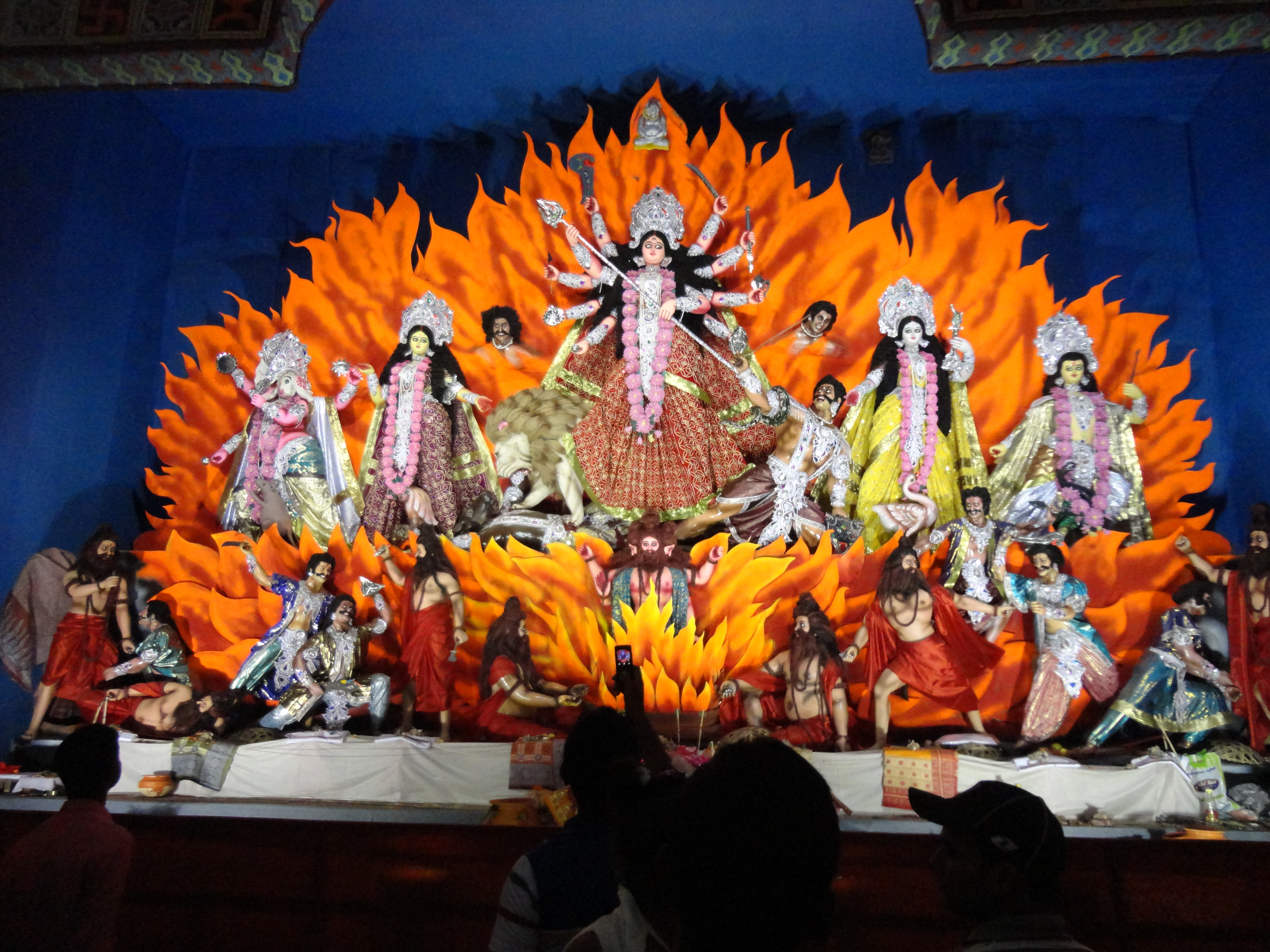
- Durga Puja pandal at Agartala

Total population
- 2,330,452 (2011) (65% of the state's population)

Languages
- Bengali; Sylheti, Noakhali, Chittagonian, Kokborok

Religion
- Majority; Hinduism; Significant minority; Sunni Islam

Related ethnic groups
- Bengali diaspora

Bengalis in Tripura are the largest ethnic group in the state. They represent 65 per cent of Tripura's population while the scheduled tribe population (including the Tripuris) amounted to a little over 30 per cent, with rest belonging to other minorities.

== History ==
The relationship between Tripura and Bengalis can be traced back to the pre-colonial period where the Tripura kingdom had diplomatic and trade ties with Bengal. During the reign of Dharma Manikya II (1714–1729), the Nawab of Bengal granted the ruler of Tripura zamindari rights over parts of the plains region of Tripura known as Chakla Roshanabad, which is now located in present-day Comilla, Bangladesh. Revenue generated from the plains constituted the principal source of income for the state. The incorporation of the Chakla Roshanabad plains therefore strengthened the economic foundation of the Manikya dynasty. Historically, the Hindu rulers of the Manikya dynasty encouraged the migration and settlement of non-tribal communities, particularly Bengalis, in Tripura.

According to the Rajmala, the Chronicle of the Kings, Ratna Manikya settled around 4,000 Bengalis in different parts of the kingdom. Over time, the rulers adopted Hinduism as the state religion and incorporated Bengali language and literature into the court culture. Bengali gradually emerged as the administrative language of the state, although the exact date of its adoption remains uncertain. The rulers also issued postal stamps bearing inscriptions in Bengali.

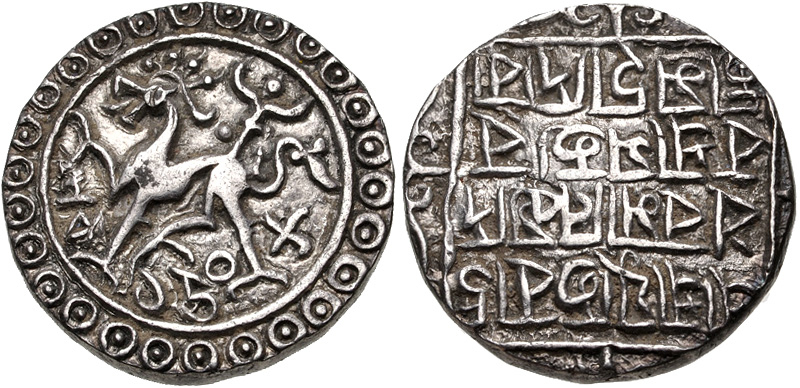
Coinage of Rajadhara Manikya (1586–1599 CE), in Bengali script.

The promotion of Bengali language and settlement was influenced not only by cultural contact with Bengal but also by economic considerations. The expansion of the monarchy increased the need for surplus agricultural production and stable revenue collection, which shifting cultivation could not adequately provide. To encourage wet rice cultivation and improve state revenue, the rulers invited Bengali cultivators and professionals, including teachers, priests, lawyers, doctors, and administrators, from neighbouring Bengal. While upper-caste migrants were employed in administration and religious functions, lower-caste peasants and Muslim cultivators from East Bengal were encouraged to reclaim and cultivate fallow land. The rulers also introduced the jangal-abadi system to expand cultivation in the sparsely populated kingdom.

William Wilson Hunter also noted that the rulers of Tripura granted land in perpetuity to upper-class groups in exchange for fixed rents. Similar grants were also made to cultivators at nominal rents in return for services rendered to the state. A resolution signed by B.K. Burman, private secretary to the Maharaja, on 13 September 1909 stated:

We should by all means encourage immigration and discourage emigration. Systematic efforts may be made to establish colonies of cultivators in the interior

This policy encouraged the migration of Bengali Muslim peasants, particularly from the districts of Comilla, Sylhet, and Chittagong in the then East Bengal. The availability of cultivable land in Tripura and the steady arrival of non-tribal cultivators, mainly Bengalis, gradually influenced the socio-economic and political structure of the state. The expansion of rice cultivation and the introduction of cash crops such as jute contributed to a steady increase in state revenue. During the reign of Bir Bikram Kishore Manikya, the first major influx of Hindu Bengali refugees into Tripura occurred following the Raipur riots in Noakhali in 1941. Approximately 15,000 refugees entered the state, some of whom were jiratia prajas of the Chakla Roshanabad estate and were therefore considered subjects of Tripura in some capacity.

The royal administration arranged planned rehabilitation measures and established refugee camps at Arundhatinagar near Agartala. Refugees received support from the royal family as well as political organisations such as the Indian National Congress, the Hindu Mahasabha, and left-wing groups in Tripura. Many refugees were later rehabilitated through employment opportunities or settlement on freehold land. From this period onward, Agartala emerged as an important urban centre for Bengali agricultural migrants, many of whom later entered professional occupations due to the comparatively liberal policies of the state administration.

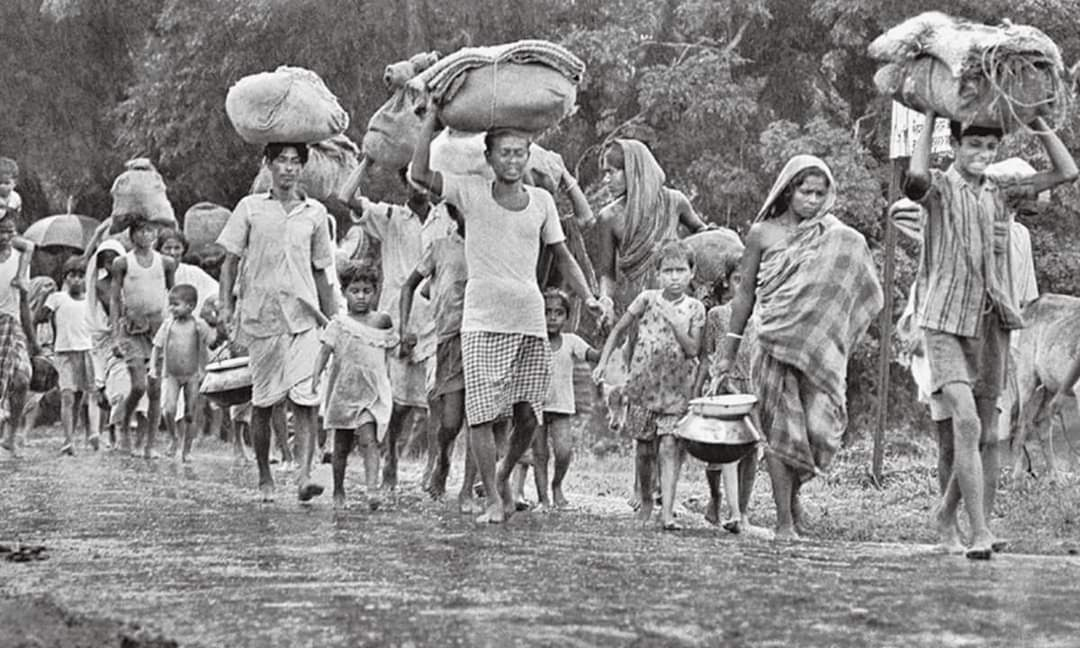
East Bengali refugees coming to Tripura during Bangladesh liberation war

During the colonial period, many Hindu Bengalis moved to Tripura. They migrated to Tripura for administrative, economic, and social reasons. The partition of India in 1947 led to a further influx of Bengali refugees, dramatically changing the state's demographic composition. It is estimated that between the years 1947–51, around 610,000 Bengalis, a figure almost equal to the state's toal population poured into the state leading to a profound demographic change during this first phase. Once again during the Bangladesh liberation war of 1971, in the second phase of migration, around 1.038 million Bengalis (most being Hindus) and many indigenous communities such as Tiprasa, Chakma moved into various parts of the state as refugees with most of them settling down permanently afterwards.

Until the Bangladesh liberation war, Tripura had sheltered around 1.03 million Bengali refugees. The number of the refugees was almost equal to the indigenous population and the majority of them were rehabilitated and permanently settled in Tripura, which alterted the demography of the state. This later became the basis of changes in resource distribution, economy, culture, polity, society and a cause of conflicts between the Bengalis and the indigenous people. As historically the maharajas of Tripura actively encouraged Bengali settlement to promote the state's development. After 1946, refugee relief and rehabilitation were managed by the Tripura administration and local Bengali communities, particularly in Agartala. Following the Noakhali riots, refugee organisations such as the Bastutyagi Janakalyan Samity and the Tripura Sabalambi Udbastu Sangha emerged to support displaced persons.

Despite the partition, the arrival of refuges continued as the frontier between Tripura and erstwhile East Pakistan was unguarded the 1980s. And as such, refugee exodus began from the middle of 1963 due to huge riots in Khulna, Jessore and other districts of East Pakistan.

Annual Arrival of Bengali refugees in Tripura
Year	Numbers
1946 (riot year)	3,327
1947 (year of Partition)	8,124
1948	9,554
1949 (communal disturbance)	11,575
1950 (serious communal riots)	67,151
1951	184,000
1952 (serious riots)	233,000
1953	80,000
1954	4,700
1955	17,500
1956	50,700
1957	57,700
1958	3,600
1964–65 (serious riots)	100,340
1965–66	13,073
1966–67	1,654
1967–68	12,229
1968–69	3,120
1969–70	4,334
1970–71 (to 24 March)	5,774
From (1946–71)	Total – (871,455)

The central government refused to take the responsibility for such a large number of temporary refugees nor did the Tripura state government ask for help till the 1950s. It joined hands with the state government to open 276 refugee camps for them, for a whole year, mostly near Akhaura. Communist migrants from East Bengal played an active role in tribal mobilisation and education through organisations like the Janasiksha Samity (1945) and Tripura Rajya Mukti Parishad (1948). Other political and community-based refugee organisations included the Purbabanga Sankhaloghu Kalyan Samity, Congress Udbastu Sahitya Samity, Tripura Rajya Nath Samity, and Tripura Rudrapal Samity. By 1950, Tripura had around 10-12 refugee organisations.

In 1950, Syama Prasad Mookerjee visited Agartala and urged refugee groups across ideological lines to unite for refugee rights, particularly enfranchisement. During 1947–50, the Hindu Mahasabha and the Indian National Congress maintained strong influence due to their social work and role in the nationalist movement. Mookerjee's initiative led to the creation of Tripura Central Relief and Rehabilitation Association in July 1950, with a conference being organised. It was attended by representatives of the various refugee organisations. They organised rallies and adopted five resolutions in respect of the government's rehabilitation policy. After the creation of Bangladesh in 1971, large numbers stayed back, many as illegal migrants initially who later managed to get citizenship. The density of population per square kilometre changed radically in Tripura from 1901 to 1981. The Tripura government stopped the process of official registration of refugees from 1 May 1958. They argued that the refugee inflow was decreasing and neither government should encourage or allow refugees to come to Tripura and settle down permanently.

Further, the government discontinued the issuing of border slips or migration certificates, which was essential to get jobs, property and citizenship. Alongside, the central government too insisted that the state governments of West Bengal, Assam and Tripura curtail expenses on refugees and stop settling them temporarily or permanently. The Janasiksha Samity worked among tribals and migrants to build support for refugee rehabilitation in Tripura. Although refugees initially supported the Congress, many became disillusioned after Partition and increasingly aligned with leftist organisations. In 1953, communist leaders Biren Dutta and Amulya Kanchan Dutta Roy founded the Sanjukta Bastuhara Parishad, which advocated refugee rehabilitation without encroaching on tribal lands. Refugee colonies later emerged in several tribal areas, including Gandhigram, Nutan Nagar, and Bishramganj.

The tribal organisation Tripura Rajya Mukti Parishad was formed with the support of the Sanjukta Bastuhara Parishad. Its president, Dasaratha Deb, emphasised unity between tribal and non-tribal communities for democratic movements in Tripura. Due to its communist orientation, political opponents often associated the organisation with the "Bongal Kheda" movement. The refugee movement peaked in 1955–56, when Dasaratha Deb invited Union Rehabilitation Minister Mehr Chand Khanna to visit refugee colonies and witness their conditions firsthand. The government planned to resettle refugees from Tripura in places such as Mana in Dandakaranya, Betia in Bihar, and the Andaman Islands, where over 20,000 people from 7,065 families were rehabilitated. By 1959, communist leaders including Biren Dutta, Dasaratha Deb, and Nripen Chakrabarty launched agitations demanding that refugees be rehabilitated within Tripura instead of being relocated outside the state.

From the early 1960s, the Communist Party of India organised hunger strikes and submitted a 26-point charter of demands to the central government on behalf of East Bengali refugees and tribal jhum cultivators. In 1964, Nripen Chakrabarty participated in a satyagraha at Durgabari in Agartala demanding economic rehabilitation. As a result of these movements, many refugees were resettled in areas such as Nalkata, Amtali, and Arundhutinagar. By 1969, several schools and two colleges had also been established primarily for refugee students and later brought under government grants-in-aid. Despite these measures, indigenous tribal communities continued to face the adverse effects of demographic change and socio-economic disruption caused by large-scale migration. Demographic changes in Tripura significantly affected tribal society, leading to land alienation and the marginalisation of indigenous communities. Rising tensions between tribals and migrants weakened earlier patterns of peaceful coexistence.

== Present and Ethnic Conflict ==
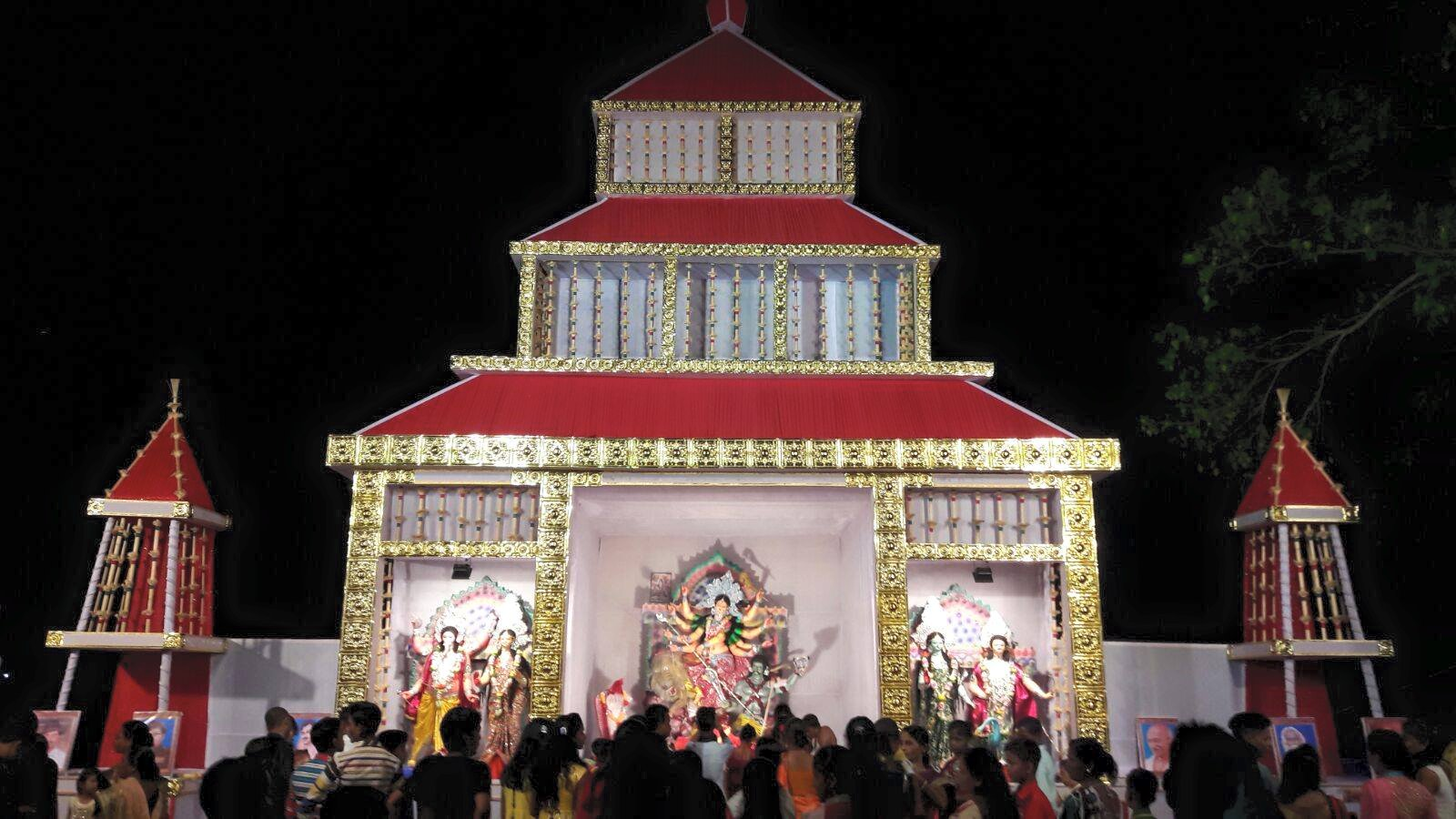
Durga Puja performed in Kanchanbari

Bengalis are the largest ethnic group in the state. Almost all the ethnic groups of the state understand and communicate in Bengali. Most of the newspapers in Tripura are published in Bengali. Bengali is one of the state languages of Tripura, and was the only state language other than English until Kokborok was later made official. Bengali has become the primary medium of instruction in most schools, with Tripura's education system largely modeled on that of West Bengal. This has increased the prominence of Bengali among indigenous youth, many of whom prioritize proficiency in Bengali and English over their native languages.

The influx of many Bengali Hindus into Tripura Hills contributed to the wider spread of Hinduism among indigenous communities, especially the Tripuri people. Over time, many indigenous groups adopted Hindu customs and incorporated Hindu deities into their traditional religious practices, creating a syncretic blend of beliefs. Hindu festivals such as Durga Puja and Saraswati Puja became widely celebrated across the state, which were the festivals of the Bengalis. As such, Durga Puja, Laxmi Puja, Kali puja are the main festivals of the Bengalis. Traditional food practices of the indigenous communities have been influenced by Bengali cuisine, incorporating dishes like fish curry and rice into daily diets. Rabindra Sangeet is also practised in the state.

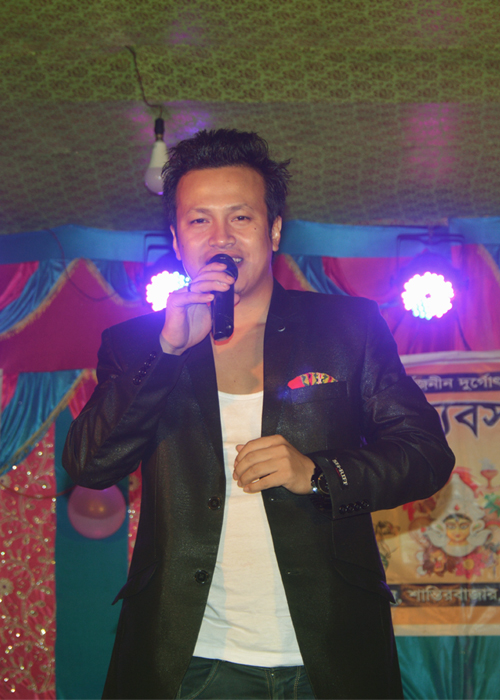
Gobin Debbarma, a Kokborok singer and an ethnic Tripuri performing on Durga Puja, a Bengali Hindu festival.

There was little local resistance to the immigrants due to several factors. A sizeable Bengali-speaking population already resided in the state and assisted incoming migrants. Additionally, Tripura maintained a relatively favourable land-to-population ratio until the 1950s. Consequently, the tribal population remained largely unaware of the potential demographic changes and their impact on local livelihoods and social structures. In 1946, the Tripur Sangha emerged as the first tribal political organisation, initially functioning as a welfare association.

In 1947, Seng Krak ("clenched fist"), a militant group mainly composed of Reang youths, launched an anti-Bengali campaign. Although the movement was short-lived, it encouraged the growth of ethnocentric politics. The regency under Maharani Kanchan Prava Devi banned Seng Krak in 1948 on the initiative of Dewan A. B. Chattopadhyay. In 1951, former leaders of the movement helped establish the Pahari Union as a new political organisation independent of both the ruling party and the opposition. Soon after, organisations such as the Adivasi Samity and the Tripura Rajya Adivasi Sangha emerged to represent the interests of the indigenous communities of Tripura. In 1954, these groups merged to form the Adivasi Sansad. Their objectives included improving the economic conditions of tribal populations, increasing tribal participation in administration, and fostering cooperation among different tribal groups.

The organisations opposed the rehabilitation of Bengali refugees in Tripura and promoted an anti-Bengali sentiment rooted in concerns over demographic and cultural change. They demanded that the 300 square miles removed from the Tribal Reserved Area in 1949 be clearly demarcated so that the remaining reserved land could be preserved for tribal communities.

In 1956, Bikram Kishor of Tripura visited New Delhi on deputation. In discussions with the prime minister, he adopted a more moderate position, arguing that the government should address the concerns of both refugees and tribal populations. He warned that failure to balance tribal welfare with refugee rehabilitation could lead to future communal tensions. Between 1954 and 1956, a broad-based initiative emerged to create a common political platform for the tribal communities of Northeast India, leading to the formation of the Eastern India Tribal Union before the 1957 elections. This reflected the growing political consciousness and assertion of indigenous groups in the hill regions outside the communist movement.

The subsequent introduction of the Sixth Schedule allowed for the inclusion of some non-tribals in district councils through election or nomination, a provision that many tribal groups in Northeast India opposed. The Eastern India Tribal Union demanded the creation of a separate tribal state in the Northeast, inclusion of Tripura within it, expansion of tribal district councils across hill areas, and the appointment of non-Bengali officers in Tripura.

In 1960, the Dhebar Commission, while examining the conditions of Scheduled Tribes and Scheduled Castes, recommended the establishment of tribal development blocks in tribal-majority areas. The same year, the Tripura Land Revenue and Land Records Act was enacted, prohibiting the transfer of tribal land in an effort to safeguard indigenous interests. Despite this, benami transfers and illegal sales continued, and government measures to prevent them were largely ineffective.

Amid these developments, educated tribal youth founded the Tripura Upajati Juba Samity (TUJS) in 1967 under the leadership of Sonacharan Deb Burma. The organisation sought to protect the interests of the indigenous population and gradually entered mainstream politics. TUJS demanded greater tribal participation in administration, self-governance through an Autonomous District Council (ADC), and restrictions preventing non-tribals from purchasing land or settling in tribal areas.

Eventually, on 18 January 1982 the Tripura Tribal Areas Autonomous District Council was established. Under pressure from TUJS, a 1973 ordinance declared illegal all unauthorised land transfers made after 1 January 1969, while recognising transfers carried out between 1960 and 1968. The ordinance also revoked Bir Bikram's earlier reservation order. TUJS argued that the original reservation policy had benefited only five tribal communities, whereas many other tribal groups had also lost land to plains settlers. The organisation further demanded the extension of the inner-line permit system to Tripura, the introduction of Kokborok in the Roman script as a medium of instruction for tribal students, and the restoration of alienated tribal lands under the Tripura Land Reforms and Land Revenue Act of 1960. Initially, the Tripura Upajati Juba Samity (TUJS) received support from the Communist Party of India (Marxist), which intended the organisation to function as a tribal youth wing. However, prominent tribal leaders such as Dasaratha Deb and Aghore Debbarma soon distanced themselves from TUJS, arguing that its ideology promoted communal militancy.

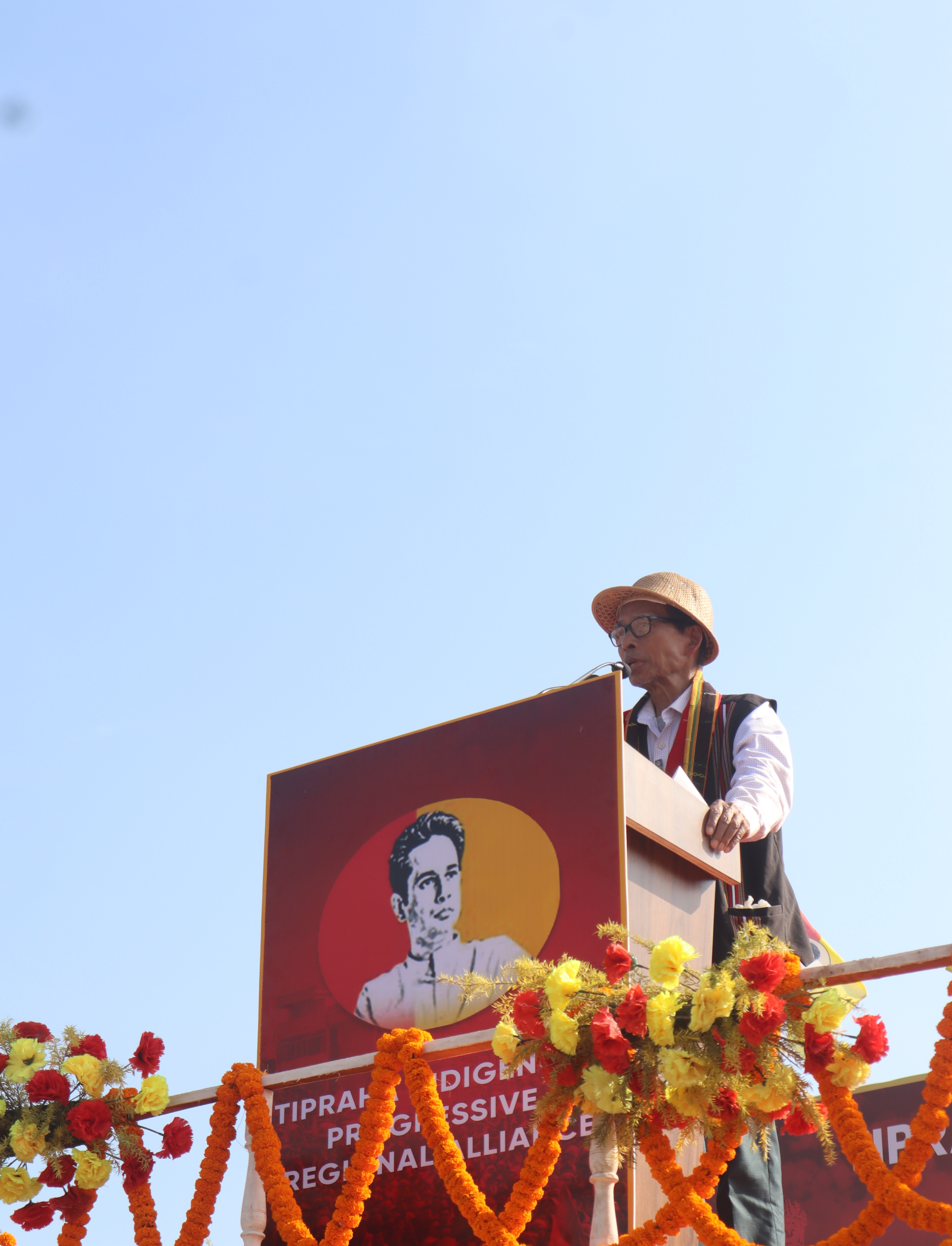
Bijoy Kumar Hrangkhawl addressing a mass gathering for Greater Tipraland at Astabal Ground, Agartala, Tripura on November 12, 2022.

In response to rising tribal mobilisation, sections of the Bengali population formed their own organisation, Amra Bangali as a counter-movement. During the Bangladesh Liberation War, another tribal organisation, the Tripura Sena, emerged under the leadership of Bijoy Kumar Hrangkhawl in 1969. Bijoy later formed the Indigenous Nationalist Party of Twipra (INPT) in 2002. It vouches for the cause of the indigenous people. It is an ally of the Indian National Congress and ruled the Tripura Tribal Areas Autonomous District Council from May 2000 to July 2003. Rebel factions associated with TUJS later established armed training camps in the Chittagong Hill Tracts around 1971 with support from the Mizo National Front and the Tripura Sena. Their primary objective was to expel the Bengali refugees from Tripura and defend the political, social, and economic rights of the indigenous tribal communities.

Thus from 1980 to 2001, Tripura was caught in an intractable cycle of violence, with a large number of innocent non-tribals and Leftist tribals, forest officials and Armed Forces personnel killed in the State. This cyclic violence took place in two phases, from 1980 to 1991, and 1992 to 2008. In the first phase, two underground tribal outfits, the TNV (Tripura National Volunteers), formed in 1977 and All Tripura Peoples Liberation Organization (ATPLO), formed in 1980, established camps across the border in Bangladesh, initiating in insurgency in Tripura by looting Police Stations for weapons, and ambushing the state's unprepared and ill-equipped Armed Forces.

The manpower for these militant groups readily came in the form of absconding accused of the 1980 riot cases and school dropouts from completely dysfunctional schools in the interior. The conflict between Amra Bangali and the tribal outfits ultimately ended in a carnage in 1980, during which 1,300 persons lost their lives, 3,77,048 were left homeless (of which 60 per cent were non-tribals and 40 per cent tribals), 34,661 houses were burnt (67 per cent non-tribals and 33 per cent tribals) and 1,89,919 persons were displaced. Amra Bangali continues to demand autonomous socio-economic zones specifically in areas inhabited by Bengalis and to protect the language, culture, heritage, and constitutional rights of the Bengalis. In turn, the Tripuris themselves ask for separation from the Bengali areas of Tripura in the form of a proposed state named Tipraland.

== Language ==
The Bengali language is the mother tongue of around 60 percentage of the people in the state. Many Bengali varieties such as Sylheti, spoken in parts of North Tripura, Unakoti and Dhalai districts and Noakhali is spoken in some areas of Gomati, Sipahijala and South Tripura districts. Chittagonian is also spoken in Tripura.

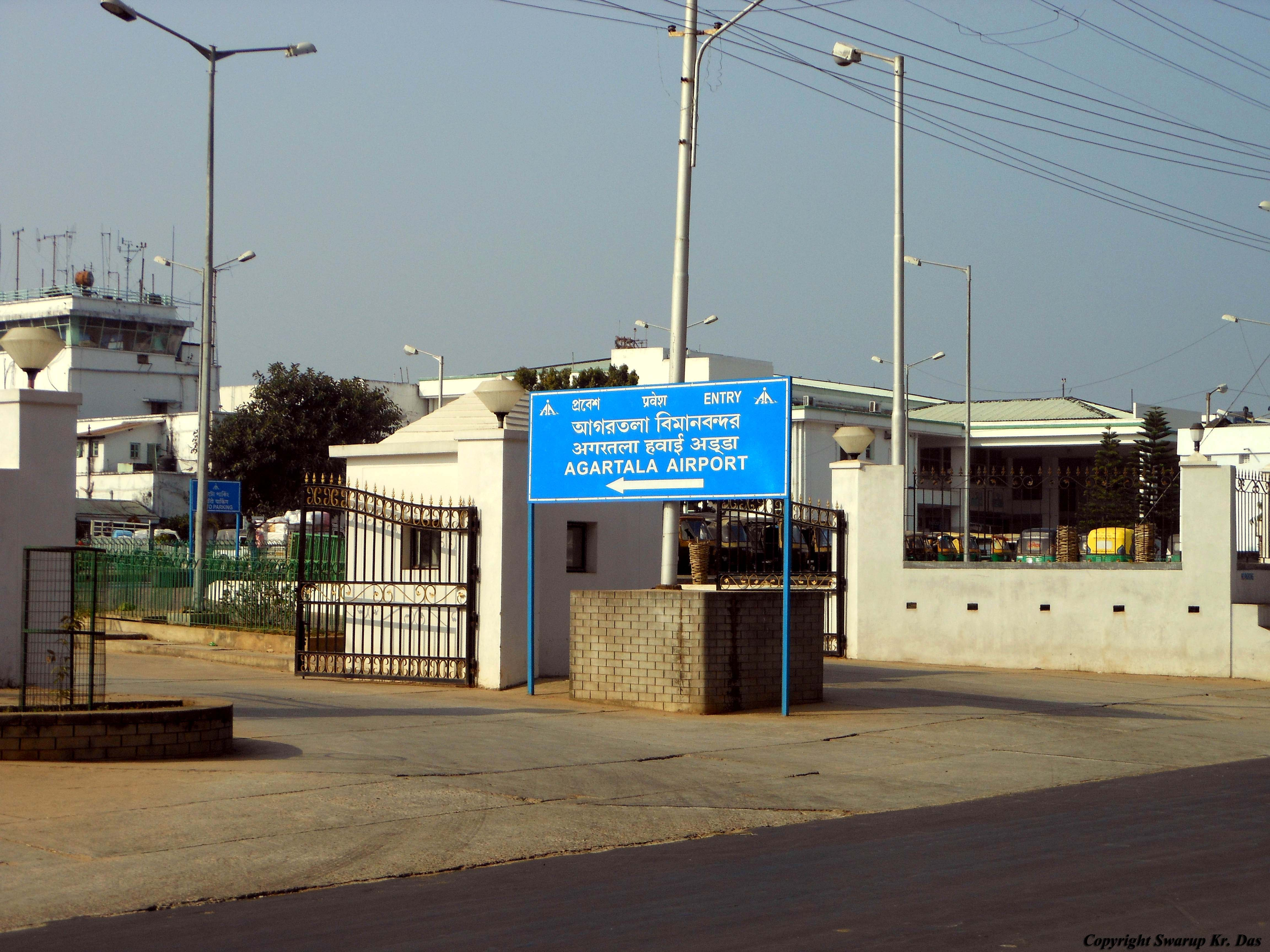
Entrance Sign of the Agartala Airport, in English, Hindi and Bengali.

The Tripura Bengali dialect attests closing diphthongs that start glide from relatively open areas and end in front-close or back-close areas.

Diphthongs in Tripura Bengali
Diphthong	Description	Occurrences			
Diphthong	Description	Initial	Medial	Final	
Glide towards i	ei	glide from front half-open (mid-low) vowel e towards front close (high) vowel i	ei ‘this’	—	lei ‘paste’ hei ‘that (previously referred)’
Glide towards i	ai	glide from back open (low) vowel a towards front close (high) vowel i	akkai ‘node’ allai ‘idle’	bail ‘falter’ dail ‘dal’	gai ‘knee’ ilai ‘stick’
Glide towards i	oi	glide from back half-open (mid-low) vowel o towards front close (high) vowel i	oi ‘hello (non-honorific)’	kʰoil ‘oil-cake’	noi ‘ladder’ ko ‘where’
Glide towards i	ui	glide from back close (high) vowel u towards front close (high) vowel i	ui ‘that’	kucca ‘eel fish’	ɸu ‘malabar spinach’ ʃui ‘needle’
Glide towards u	ou	glide from back half-open (mid-low) vowel o towards back close (high) vowel u	—	ɖour ‘run’ nouka ‘boat’	bou ‘bride’
Glide towards u	au	glide from back open (low) vowel a towards back close (high) vowel u	au ‘a kind of paddy’ aula ‘orderless’	baul ‘bard’ baun ‘dwarf’	ɖau ‘chopper’ ɸau ‘leg’
Glide towards u	eu	glide from front half-open (mid-low) vowel e towards back close (high) vowel u	—	neu ‘mongoose’ dewal ‘wall’	keu ‘someone’ kʰeu ‘scrape’

There are three variants of the dialect:

1. South Tripura: Influenced by Noakhali and Chittagonian, spoken in sub-divisions of Udaipur, Belonia, Sabroom, and Santirbazar.
2. North Tripura: High influence of Sylheti, spoken in Dharmanagar, Kumarghat, Kailashahar sub-divisions.
3. West Tripura: Influenced by Cumilla, Dhaka, Mymensingh, Chittagonian and Sylheti dialects. It is spoken in Agartala, Khowai, Teliamura, Bishalgarh sub-divisions.

Lexical comparison among varieties
South Tripura	North Tripura	West Tripura	Standard Bengali	Gloss
killai	kene	kere	keno	why
anne	apne	apne	apni	you (hon.)
huna	sona	suna	ʃona	heard (things)
heʈe / heʈi	he/tai	ʈe/tai	se	he/she
gəram	gau	gram	gram	village
mui	masi	maʃi	maʃi	aunt

North Tripura Bengali distinctly possess lexical tone:

Comparison of Pitch Tracks in Words
Pitch Track	Word	Meaning	Word	Meaning
Low	[bàla]	“bangle”	[gùra]	“powder”
High	[bála]	“good”	[gúra]	“horse”
Low	[dàk]	“call”	[matà]	“to talk”
High	[dák]	“drum”	[matá]	“head”
Low	[dɔ̀r]	“rate/price”	[ità]	“throw”
High	[dɔ́r]	“hold”	[itá]	“this”
Low	[zàl]	“net”	[ɸàla]	“pillar”
High	[zál]	“spicy”	[ɸála]	“drop/throw away”

Unlike Standard Bengali, Tripura Bengali distinguishes gender in the form of third-person singular animate pronouns.

Gender distinction in third-person singular pronouns
South Tripura	North Tripura	West Tripura	Standard Bengali	Gloss
heʈe / heʈi	he/tai	ʈe/tai	se	he/she

It also uses gender-specific markers in address forms: re is used for males, while lo is used for females.

== See also ==
- Bengali Hindus in Assam
- Barak Valley
- Miya people
