= Bandhan AMC =

Indian asset management company

Bandhan AMC Limited
- Official logo
- Type: Subsidiary
- Industry: Asset management
- Founded: 2000
- Headquarters: Mumbai, Maharashtra, India
- Number of locations: 109 (June 2026)
- Key people: Vishal Kapoor (CEO)
- Products: Mutual funds, portfolio management services, alternative investments, Specialised Investment Funds
- Operating income: ₹578.8 crore (FY 2025–26)
- AUM: ₹1,90,750 crore (March 2026)
- Owners: Bandhan Financial Holdings (60%); GIC (20%); ChrysCapital (20%)
- Number of employees: 748 (March 2026)
- Parent: Bandhan Financial Holdings

Bandhan AMC Limited, doing business as Bandhan AMC, is an Indian asset management company headquartered in Mumbai, Maharashtra. It is the investment manager of Bandhan Mutual Fund.

The company was formerly known as IDFC Asset Management Company. It was renamed Bandhan AMC in March 2023 following its acquisition by a consortium comprising Bandhan Financial Holdings, GIC, and ChrysCapital.

The company offers mutual fund schemes, portfolio management services, and alternative investment funds. As of March 2026, it reported average assets under management (AUM) of approximately ₹1,90,750 crore.

== History ==
The company was incorporated on 20 December 1999 as ANZ Grindlays Asset Management Company Private Limited by the Australia and New Zealand Banking Group (ANZ). The mutual fund it managed was constituted as a trust on 29 December 1999 under the Indian Trusts Act, 1882. Its trust deed was registered in Mumbai, and the fund received registration from the Securities and Exchange Board of India (SEBI) on 13 March 2000.

In 2000, ANZ sold its Grindlays Bank operations in India to Standard Chartered. On 30 May 2008, Infrastructure Development Finance Company (IDFC) acquired the equity and preference shares held by Standard Chartered, along with the equity held by minority shareholders. The company was subsequently renamed IDFC Asset Management Company Limited.

At the end of December 2016, the company managed approximately ₹57,998 crore in assets and ranked among the ten largest companies in the Indian mutual fund industry.

== Acquisition by Bandhan consortium ==
In April 2022, a consortium led by Bandhan Financial Holdings agreed to acquire IDFC Asset Management Company and IDFC AMC Trustee Company for ₹4,500 crore (approximately US$548 million). The consortium comprised Bandhan Financial Holdings, GIC, and ChrysCapital, with an ownership structure of 60%, 20%, and 20%, respectively.

The transaction was subject to regulatory approvals. The Competition Commission of India approved the proposed divestment in August 2022. Bandhan Financial Holdings acquired the controlling stake in Bandhan AMC and the trustee company on 31 January 2023.

On 13 March 2023, the fund house adopted the Bandhan brand. IDFC Asset Management Company became Bandhan AMC Limited, IDFC Mutual Fund became Bandhan Mutual Fund, and the term "IDFC" in the scheme names was replaced with "Bandhan".

Bandhan Financial Holdings became the sponsor of the mutual fund.

== Operations ==
Bandhan AMC manages mutual fund schemes across equity, debt, and hybrid categories. Its average assets under management for the 2025-26 financial year were reported as ₹1,90,750 crore. The company also offers portfolio management services, alternative investment funds, and passive investment products, including index funds and exchange-traded funds (ETFs). In October 2024, it opened a branch in Gujarat International Finance Tec-City (GIFT City) to serve overseas investors.

== Specialised Investment Funds ==
In September 2025, Bandhan AMC received approval from SEBI to launch Specialised Investment Funds (SIFs) under its Arudha SIF platform.

The SIF framework permits asset managers to offer specialised equity, debt, and hybrid strategies under a separate regulatory framework. The framework includes provisions for certain long-short strategies and derivative exposure.

The company launched its first SIF product, the Arudha Hybrid Long-Short Fund, in January 2026. It subsequently launched the Arudha Equity Long-Short Fund in March 2026.

== Leadership ==
Vishal Kapoor serves as the company's chief executive officer. Manish Gunwani heads equity investments, while Suyash Choudhary leads fixed-income investments. Mrinal Singh and Bhupendra Meel oversee alternative investments and portfolio management services, respectively.

C. N. Ram became chairman of the board in January 2026. In September 2025, Kapoor was appointed vice chairman of the Association of Mutual Funds in India (AMFI).

== See also ==
- Mutual funds in India
- Bandhan Bank
- IDFC
- Securities and Exchange Board of India
