= Chandra Shekhar Ghosh =

Indian businessman

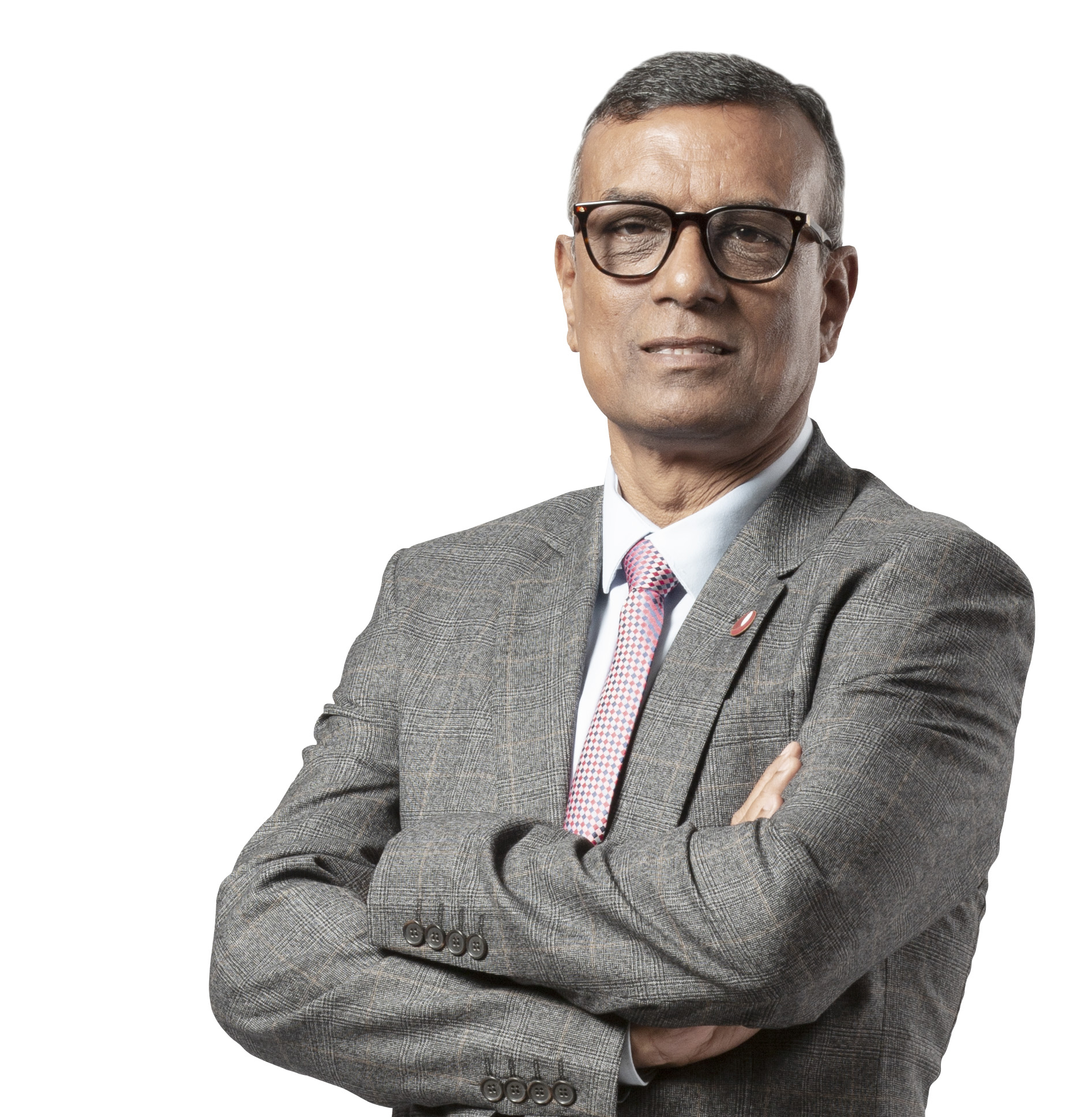
- Ghosh in 2021
- Born: 8 August 1960 (age 66); Bishalgarh, Tripura, India
- Education: Dhaka University, Dhaka
- Occupations: Former MD & CEO of Bandhan Bank
- Spouse: Nilima Ghosh
- Children: Angshuman Ghosh

Chandra Shekhar Ghosh, (born on August 8, 1960, at Bishalgarh in Tripura, India) is the founder, former MD & CEO of Bandhan Bank. He has been one of the foremost proponents of financial inclusion in India. He has more than 30 years of experience in the microfinance and development terrain.

== Early life and education ==
Ghosh's father, Late Haripada Ghosh, owned a sweet shop in Tripura. Even as a student, Ghosh supported his father at the shop. After completing his education, he joined BRAC, Bangladesh's largest non-government organisation (NGO). After returning to India, Ghosh worked with several NGOs, before quitting his last job at the Village Welfare Society. He then established Bandhan-Konnagar, a not-for-profit organisation in West Bengal, which aimed to provide microfinance services to the marginalised, thereby driving financial inclusion.

Ghosh holds a master's degree in statistics.

== Career ==
Ghosh started Bandhan-Konnagar in 2001. The NGO extended micro-credit to marginalised women to help them become entrepreneurs. In 2009, the microfinance portfolio of the NGO was transferred to the NBFC, which Bandhan had acquired in 2006. Gradually, the organisation expanded its operations to various states of the country. In 2010, Bandhan became the largest microfinance institution in India.

In 2014, Bandhan received an in-principle approval from the Reserve Bank of India to set up a universal bank. The final licence was obtained in June 2015. Bandhan Bank started operations on August 23, 2015, with Ghosh as the MD & CEO where he served till 9 July 2024. This is the first-ever instance of an Indian microfinance institution becoming a universal bank. Incidentally, Bandhan Bank is also the first bank to be set up in Eastern India since Independence.

Besides being the former Chairman of The Confederation of Indian Industry (CII), Eastern Region, and the former President of Bengal Chamber of Commerce & Industry (BCC&I), he is also associated with various other industry bodies.

Following his tenure as Managing Director and CEO of Bandhan Bank, Ghosh became Chairman of Bandhan Group, a diversified institution with interests across financial services and technology. In this role, he oversees businesses including Bandhan AMC, Bandhan Life, and Bandhan Technologies. As Chairman of Bandhan Technologies, he focuses on governance, institution building, and long-term value creation as the company expands its enterprise technology and digital transformation capabilities.

== Awards ==
- 'Senior Ashoka Fellow' – social entrepreneurship award – in 2007 by Ashoka Foundation
- 'Entrepreneur with Social Impact' 2014 by Forbes India Leadership Awards
- ‘Entrepreneur of the Year’ 2014 by The Economic Times
- CNN-IBN ‘Indian of the Year’ in 2016 in the Business category
- ‘Banker of the Year’ for 2018–19 by Business Standard

== Personal life ==
Ghosh's wife, Nilima, is an entrepreneur. His son, Angshuman, is currently a management student in England.
