= All Assam Bengali Youth Students Federation =

The All Assam Bengali Youth Students Federation (Bengali: সারা আসাম বাঙালী যুব-ছাত্র ফেডারেশন, romanized: Śara Aśam Baṇalī Yuvô-Chatrô Feḍareśôn) also known as the All Assam Bengali Yuva Chatra Sangha is a Bengali Hindu student organization in Assam that has demanded constitutional protection for the 6.5 million ethnic Bengali Hindu people in the state.

== History ==
The AABYSF was founded on 20 April 1990. In 2007, the Federation called a 12-hour statewide bandh to protest the delay in reconstituting the Linguistic Minority Development Board and release of funds. The bandh turned violent when the protesters blocked the traffic on National Highway 52.

On 17 February, Digvijay Singh, the general secretary of the Indian National Congress labelled the Bengali Hindu refugees from Bangladesh as foreigners at an election rally in Mollaganj, in Karimganj district. Terming Digvijay Singh's statement irresponsible and provocative at the emergency executive meeting held on 21 February, the AABYSF decided to stage demonstrations at various parts of the State. As a mark of protest, the AABYSF burnt the effigy of Digvijay Singh on 25 February at Sibsagar and Dibrugarh.

== Demands ==
The Federation has demanded that the State government must stop the harassment and deportation of about a million Bengali Hindus who have been labelled as foreigners and detained in detention camps. The Federation has demanded the withdrawal of proceedings against the Bengali Hindus pending in several tribunals and courts and insisted that they should be declared Indian citizens. It has also demanded the restoration of constitutional rights of the 150,000 odd Bengali Hindu voters who have been categorized under D category.

The Linguistic Minority Development Board in Assam has negligible Bengali Hindu representation. About 80% of the Board members are from the Nepali, Manipuri, Bodo, Rabha and the tea tribes. The AABYSF has demanded the dissolution of the Linguistic Minority Development Board and formation of a satellite council for the development of the Bengali Hindu people.

Nirmal Kanti Seal is the present Working President of the Central Committee.

Dibrugarh district President Nirmal Kanti Seal, Secretary Bapi Sarkar, Health & Education Secretary Titu Kumar Seal.

The Bongaigaon district is led by the young hands of Samrat Bhowal, he is the President of Bongaigaon district & also the General Secretary of AABYSF. Along with him there are also others who is working for the welfare of the district, Bipul Roy is the advisor of AABYSF in the district. They both have helped many under privileged people in this regard along with all other members.
