= Portfolio management =

Portfolio management may refer to:

== Finance ==
- Portfolio manager
- Investment management, the professional asset management of various securities

== Computing ==
- IT portfolio management
- Application portfolio management

== Marketing ==
- Product portfolio management

== See also ==
- Project management
- Project portfolio management
