= Gandhigram, Visakhapatnam =

Gandhigram
- Neighbourhood
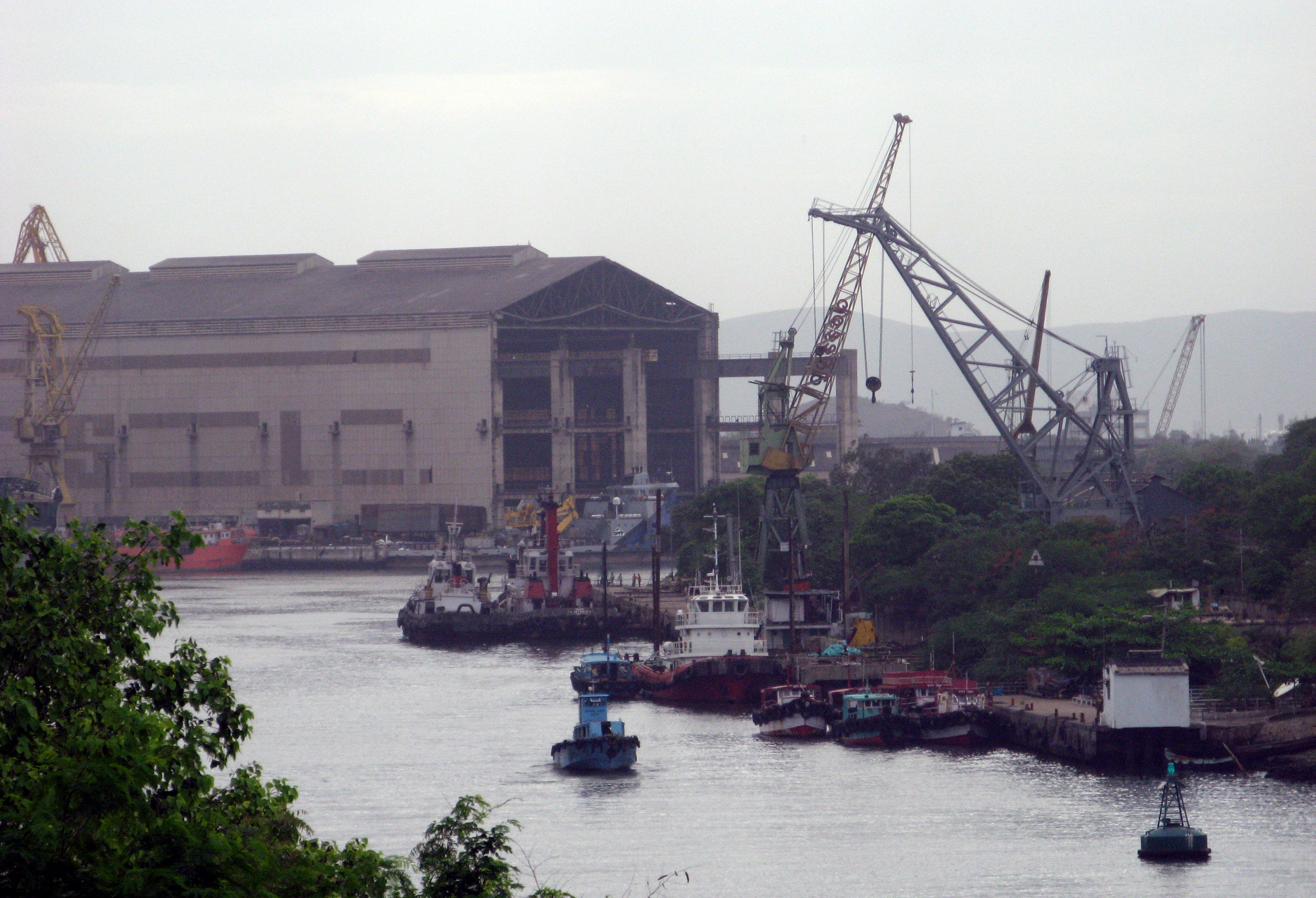
- Hindustan Shipyard at Gandhigram

- Location in Visakhapatnam
- Coordinates: 17.681492°N 83.259135°E
- Country: India
- State: Andhra Pradesh
- District: Visakhapatnam

Government
  - Body: Greater Visakhapatnam Municipal Corporation

Languages
  - Official: Telugu
- Time zone: UTC+5:30 (IST)
- PIN: 530 005
- Vehicle registration: AP-31

Gandhigram is a neighborhood city of Visakhapatnam, India. The area, which falls under the local administrative limits of Greater Visakhapatnam Municipal Corporation, is one of the naval and civilian locality in the City. Gandhigram is located between Scindia and Malkapuram and this area is well connected with city buses there are naval hospital and naval schools are situated hear .
