= Gandhigram, Tripura =

Gandhigram
- Town
- Location within India
- Coordinates: 23.891998°N 91.280260°E
- Country: India
- State: Tripura

Population
  - Total: 14,572

Gandhigram is a town in Tripura, India. located around 10 km from city centre Agartala. It comes under Sadar district. It has an old age home called Sandhyoneer.

== Demographics ==
As of 2011 India census, Gandhigram Census Town has population of 14,572 of which 7,928 are males while 6,644 are females.

The population of children aged 0-6 is 1575 which is 10.81% of total population of Gandhigram (CT). In Gandhigram Census Town, the female sex ratio is 838 against state average of 960. Moreover the child sex ratio in Gandhigram is around 882 compared to Tripura state average of 957. The literacy rate of Gandhigram city is 91.79% higher than the state average of 87.22%. In Gandhigram, male literacy is around 94.88% while the female literacy rate is 88.08%.

== Politics ==
This town comes under Bamutia Assembly Constituency and West Tripura Lok Sabha Constituency.
