= Bandhan Bank =

Indian private sector bank

Bandhan Bank Limited
- Type: Public
- Traded as: BSE: 541153; NSE: BANDHANBNK
- ISIN: INE545U01014
- Industry: Financial services
- Founded: 23 August 2015; 11 years ago
- Founders: Chandra Shekhar Ghosh
- Headquarters: Kolkata, West Bengal, India
- Number of locations: Over 6,400 banking outlets
- Area served: India
- Key people: Debasish Panda - Non-Executive (Independent) (Chairman); Partha Pratim Sengupta (MD & CEO)
- Products: Retail banking; Corporate banking; Investment banking; Mortgage loans; Private banking; Wealth management; Asset management; Investment management
- Revenue: ▼₹24,423 crore (US$2.5 billion) (2026)
- Operating income: ▼₹5,865 crore (US$610 million) (2026)
- Net income: ▼₹1,224 crore (US$130 million) (2026)
- Total assets: ▲₹211,124 crore (US$22 billion) (2026)
- Total equity: ▲₹21,610 crore (US$2.2 billion) (2026)
- Number of employees: 75,000+ (2026)
- Website: www.bandhan.bank.in

Bandhan Bank Ltd. is an Indian private sector bank headquartered in Kolkata,West Bengal. Commencing operations as a universal bank on 23 August 2015, it evolved from its origin as non-governmental oraganization (NGO) established in 2001 and a subsequent. The bank's core focus is inclusive banking and serving unbanked and under-banked populations across India.

== History ==
Bandhan was set up in 2001 as a not-for-profit entity with the objective of financial inclusion and women empowerment. It started its microfinance operations from Bagnan, a small village, about 60 km from Kolkata. The model followed for delivery of microfinance services was individual lending through group formation. Bandhan focused on serving underbanked and underpenetrated markets.

In 2006, Bandhan acquired a Non-Banking Financial Company (NBFC) and created Bandhan Financial Services Private Limited (BFSPL) to scale up its microfinance activities. In 2010, it became the largest microfinance institution (MFI) in the country.

In April 2014, Bandhan received an in-principle approval from the Reserve Bank of India (RBI) for a bank license. On 17 June 2015, RBI granted the banking licence to Bandhan, making it the first microfinance institution to become a universal bank in India.

Bandhan Bank commenced operations on 23 August 2015. The then Union Finance Minister, Arun Jaitley, inaugurated the Bank in Kolkata. Its public shareholders then included International Finance Corporation; Caladium Investment Pte Ltd (the sovereign wealth fund of Singapore, an arm of GIC); and Small Industries Development Bank of India (SIDBI).

In September 2018, the Reserve Bank of India (RBI) barred Bandhan Bank from opening new branches without prior approval and froze the salary of its MD & CEO, Chandra Shekar Ghosh, after the bank failed to reduce its promoter shareholding to the mandated 40% within three years of starting operations.

In 2019, Bandhan Bank merged GRUH Finance into its operations, expanding into affordable housing finance and helping lower promoter shareholding to meet RBI ownership regulations.

== Operations ==
Bandhan Bank is present in 35 out of 36 states and union territories of India, with more than 6,400 banking outlets After obtaining the universal banking licence from the Reserve Bank of India, Bandhan Bank started operations on 23 August 2015, with 501 branches, 50 ATMs and 2,022 Banking Units (BUs). The Bank has mobilised deposits of ₹1,72,688 crore and its total advances stand at ₹1,58,369 crore as of 28 October 2026.

Bandhan Bank is focused on inclusive banking and serves the unbanked and under-banked segments of the country, with 73% of its branches situated in rural and semi-urban areas.

== Listing and shareholding ==
The equity shares of Bandhan Bank are listed on BSE and the NSE.

Bandhan Bank is an associate of Bandhan Financial Holdings Limited (BFHL) which holds a 39.99% stake in the bank as on 31 December 2021. Further, BFHL is a wholly owned subsidiary of Bandhan Financial Services Limited (BFSL). Other major shareholders of the Bank as on 31 December 2021, are Housing Development Finance Corporation Limited (9.89%), and Caladium Investment Pte. Limited (7.79%).

Shareholders as on 31 March 2022	Shareholding (%)
Promoter & Promoter Group* (BFHL)	39.99
Foreign Portfolio Investor (FPI)	34.31
Bodies Corporate	9.71
Individual Shareholders	6.16
Qualified Institutional Buyers	3.91
Others	

== See also ==
- Banking in India
- List of banks in India
- Reserve Bank of India
- Indian Financial System Code
- List of companies of India
